= Thimphu =

Capital and largest city of Bhutan

Thimphu ཐིམ་ཕུག་
- Capital city and Thromde
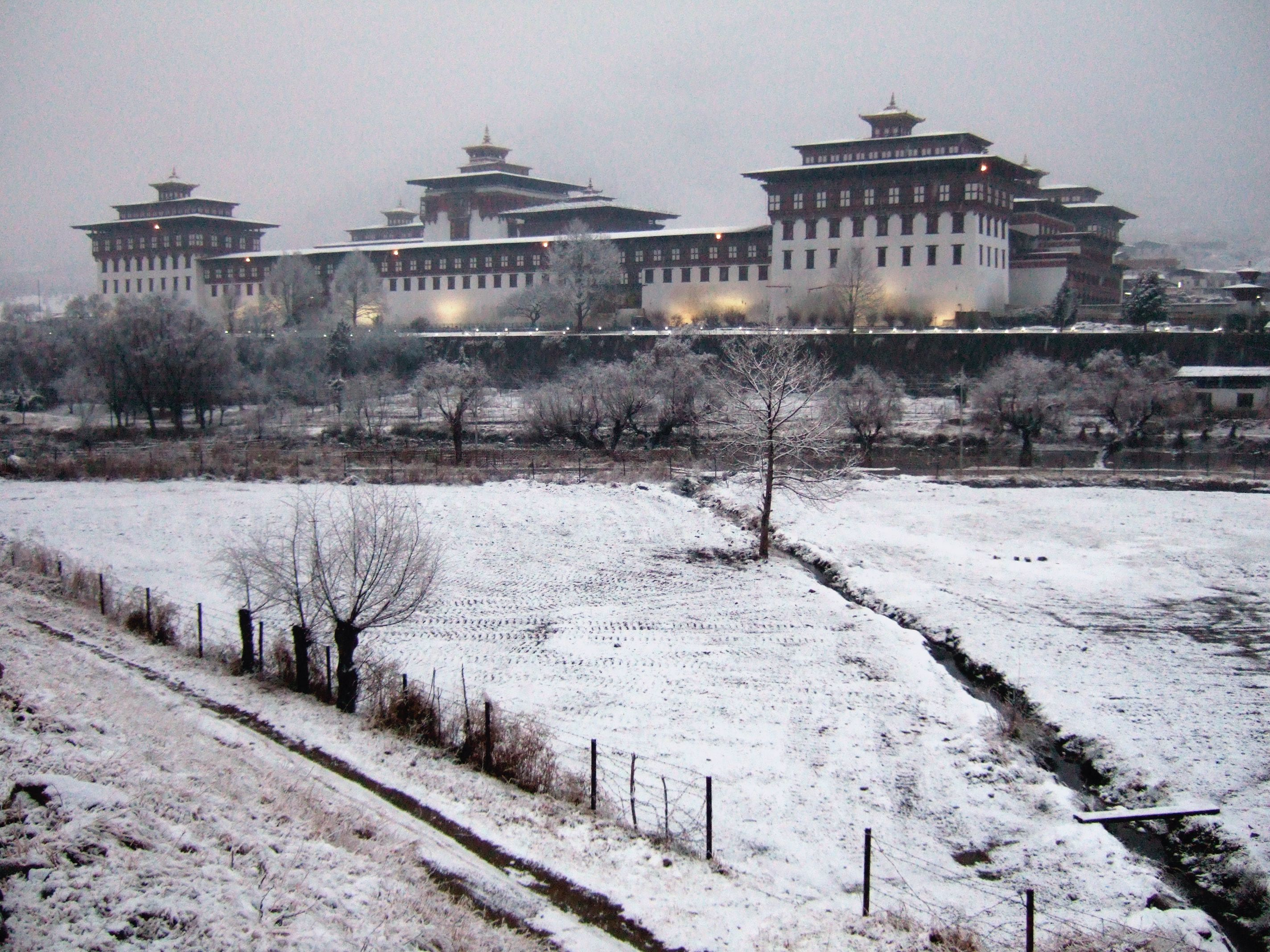
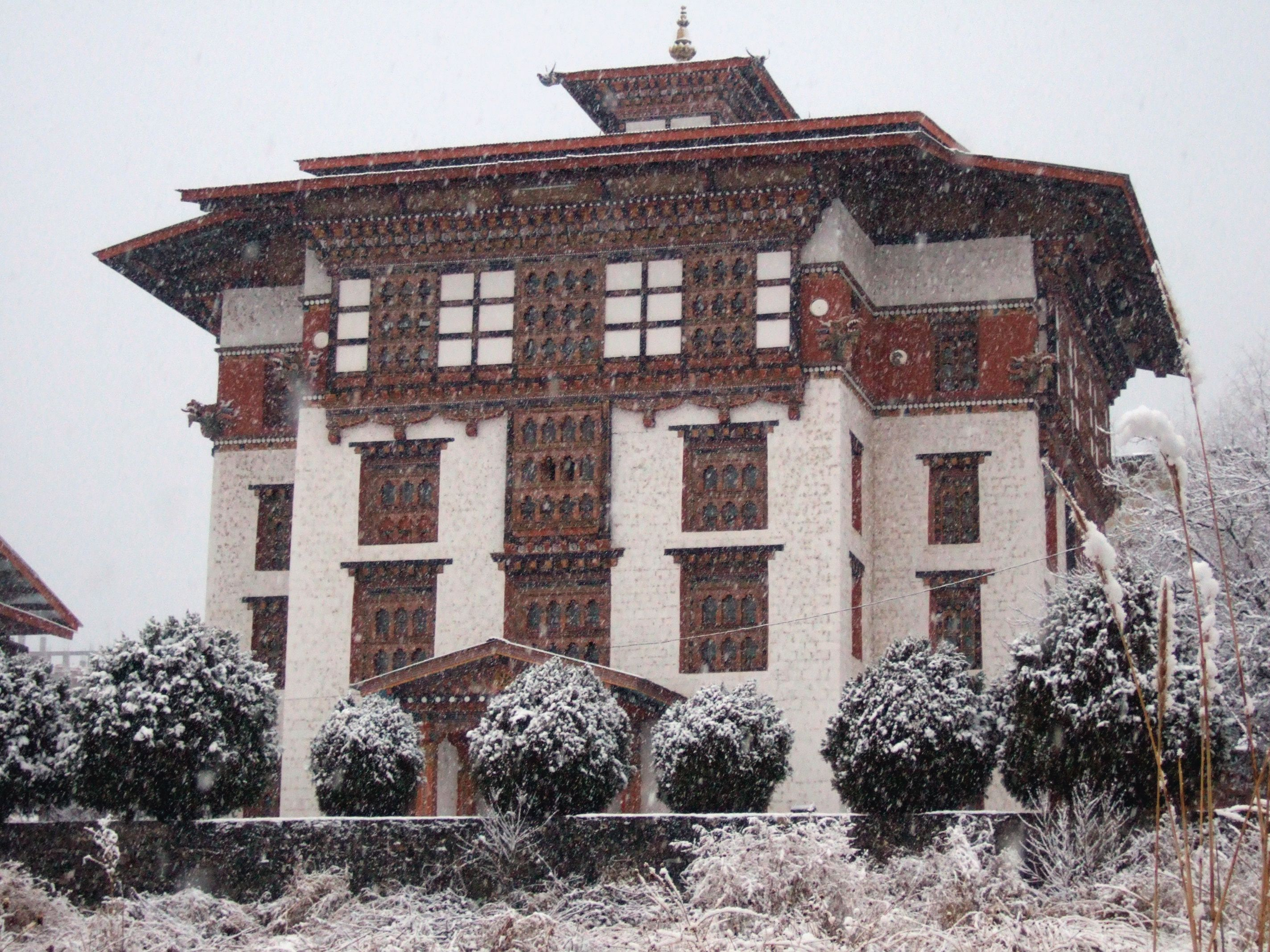
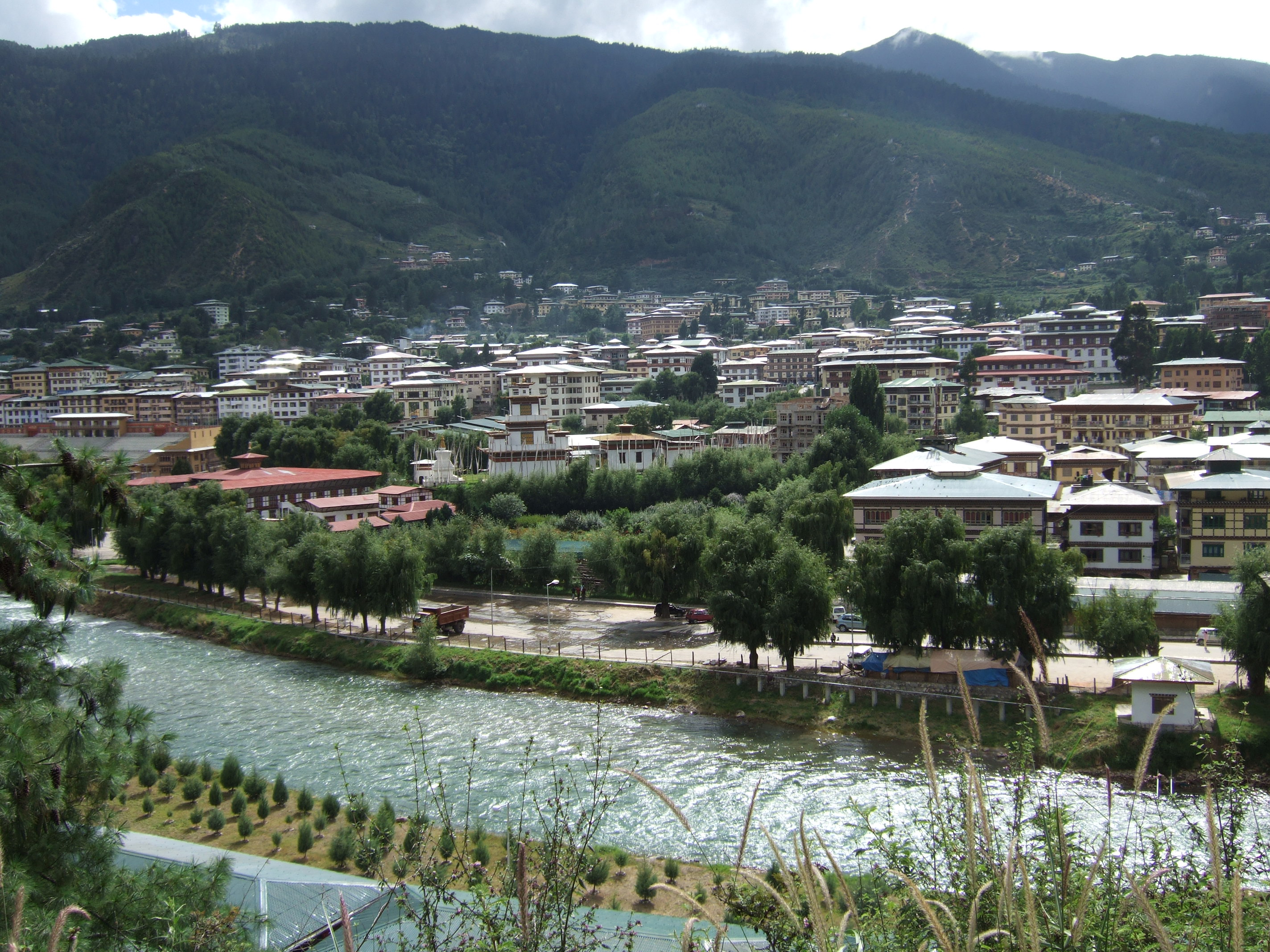
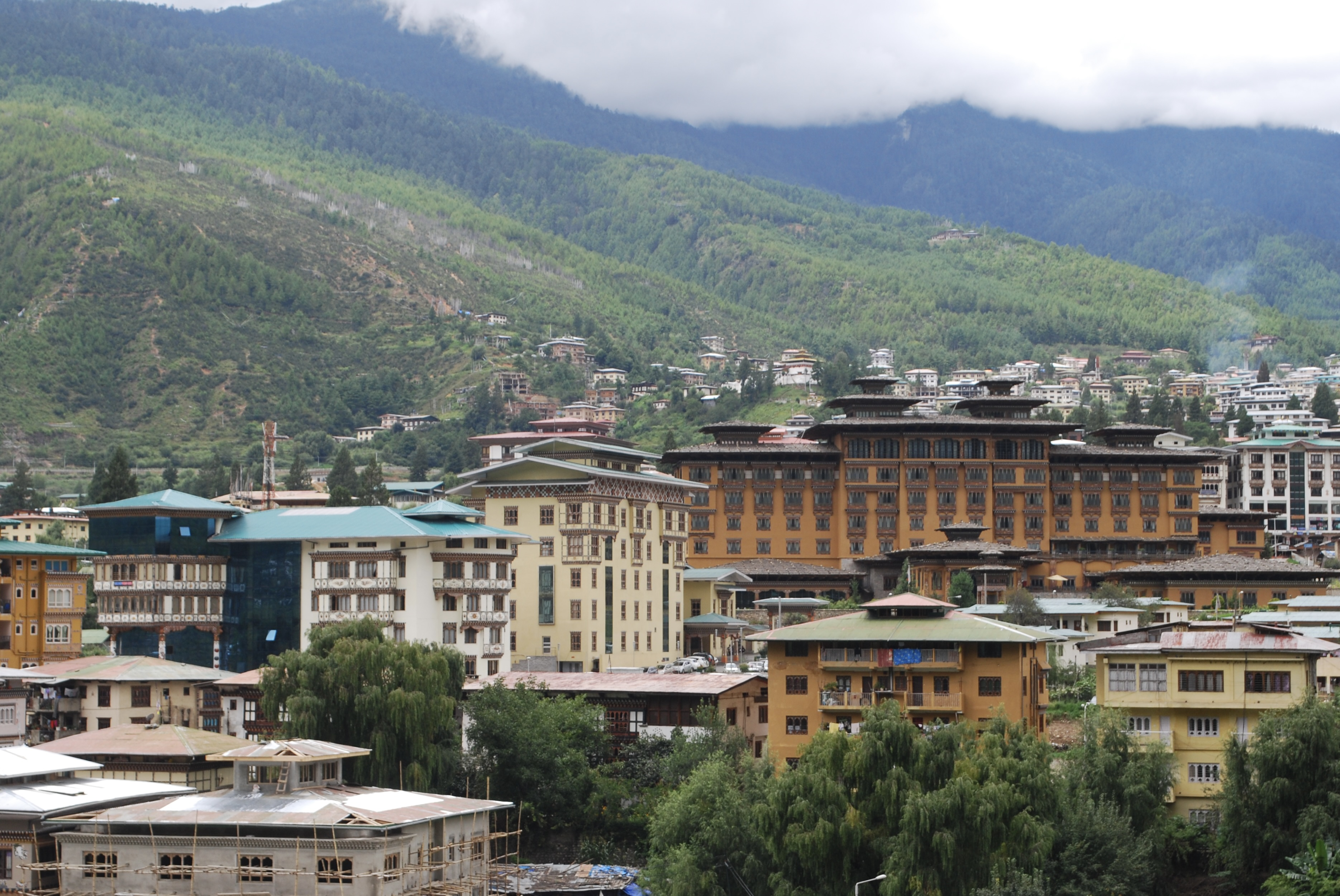
- Tashichho Dzong National Library of Bhutan Aerial view of Thimphu Thimphu Business District

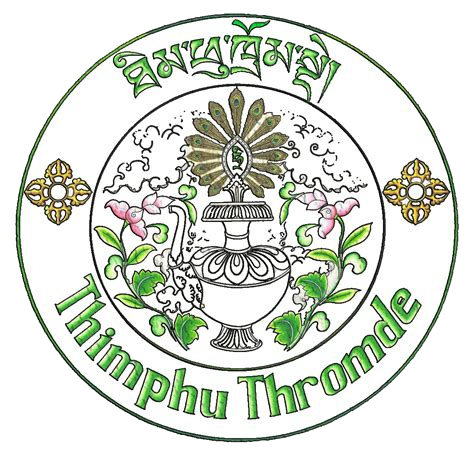
- Seal

- Location within Bhutan Location within Asia
- Coordinates: 27°28′20″N 89°38′10″E
- Country: Bhutan
- District: Thimphu
- Gewogs: Chang, Kawang
- Established as capital: 1955
- Township: 1961
- Municipality: 2009

Government
  - Druk Gyalpo: Jigme Khesar Namgyel Wangchuck
  - Thrompon: Ugyen Dorji

Area
  - Total: 26.1 km^{2} (10.1 sq mi)
- Elevation: 2,320 m (7,610 ft)

Population (2017)
  - Total: 114,551
  - Density: 4,389/km^{2} (11,370/sq mi)
- Time zone: UTC+06:00 (BTT)
- Area code: +975-2
- Climate: Cwb
- Website: thimphucity.bt

Thimphu (/tɪmˈpuː/ tim-POOH; Dzongkha: ཐིམ་ཕུག་ [tʰim˥.pʰu˥]) is the capital and largest city of Bhutan. It is situated in the western central part of Bhutan, and the surrounding valley is one of Bhutan's dzongkhags, the Thimphu District. The ancient capital city of Punakha was replaced by Thimphu as the capital in 1955, and in 1961 Thimphu was officially declared the capital of the Kingdom of Bhutan by the 3rd Druk Gyalpo Jigme Dorji Wangchuck.

The city extends in a north–south direction on the west bank of the valley formed by the Wang Chhu, which flows out into India as the Raidāk River. Thimphu is the fifth highest capital in the world by altitude and the highest capital in Asia, ranging from 2,248 metres (7,375 feet) to 2,648 metres (8,688 feet). Unlike many capitals, Thimphu does not have its own airport, instead relying on the Paro International Airport, accessible by road 52 kilometres (32 miles) away.

Thimphu, as the political and economic center of Bhutan, has a dominant agriculture and livestock base, contributing to about 45% of the country's GNP. Tourism, though a contributor to the economy, is strictly regulated, maintaining a balance between tradition, development, and modernization. Thimphu contains most of the important political buildings in Bhutan, including the National Assembly of the parliamentary democracy and Dechencholing Palace, the official residence of the King, located to the north of the city. The city’s development is guided by the "Thimphu Structure Plan, 2002–2027", an urban plan aimed at protecting the fragile ecology of the valley. Some development has been supported by the World Bank and Asian Development Bank.

The culture of Bhutan is reflected fully in Thimphu, through literature, religion, customs, national dress code, monastic practices, music, dance, and media. The annual Tshechu festival, held in September or October according to the Bhutanese calendar, is a major event featuring mask dances known as Cham dances, performed in the courtyards of the Tashichho Dzong.

== History ==
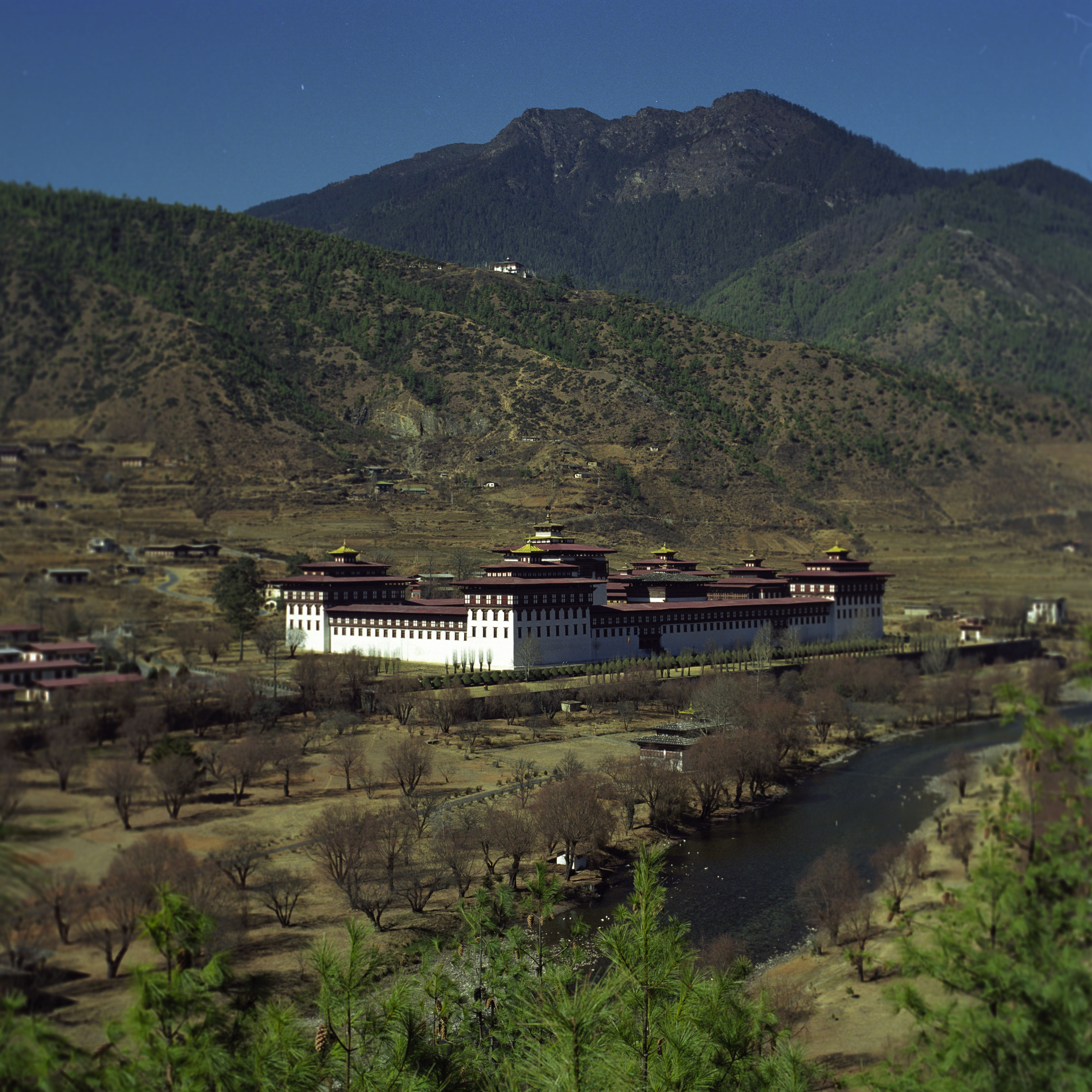
View of Tashichoedzong, Thimbu. The 17th-century fortress-monastery, located on the northern edge of the city, has been the seat of Bhutan's government since 1952.

Before 1960, Thimphu consisted of a group of hamlets scattered across the valley including Motithang, Changangkha, Changlimithang, Langchupakha, and Taba, some of which constitute districts of the city today (see below for district details). In 1885, a battle was held at what is now the Changlimithang sports ground in Thimphu. The decisive victory opened the way for Ugyen Wangchuck, the first King of Bhutan, to virtually control the whole country. Since this time the sports ground has been of major importance to the city; football, cricket matches and archery competitions take place there. The modern Changlimithang Stadium was built on the site in 1974. Under the Wangchuck dynasty, the country enjoyed peace and progress under successive reformist monarchs. The third king, Jigme Dorji Wangchuck, reformed the old pseudo-feudal systems by abolishing serfdom, redistributing land, and reforming taxation. He also introduced many executive, legislative, and judiciary reforms. Reforms continued and in 1952 the decision was made to shift the capital from the ancient capital of Punakha to Thimphu. The fourth king, Jigme Singye Wangchuck, opened the country for development and India provided the needed impetus in this process with financial and other forms of assistance. In 1961, Thimphu officially became the capital of Bhutan.

Bhutan joined the Colombo Plan in 1962, the Universal Postal Union in 1969 and became a member of the United Nations in 1971. The presence of diplomatic missions and international funding organizations in Thimphu resulted in rapid expansion of Thimphu as a metropolis.

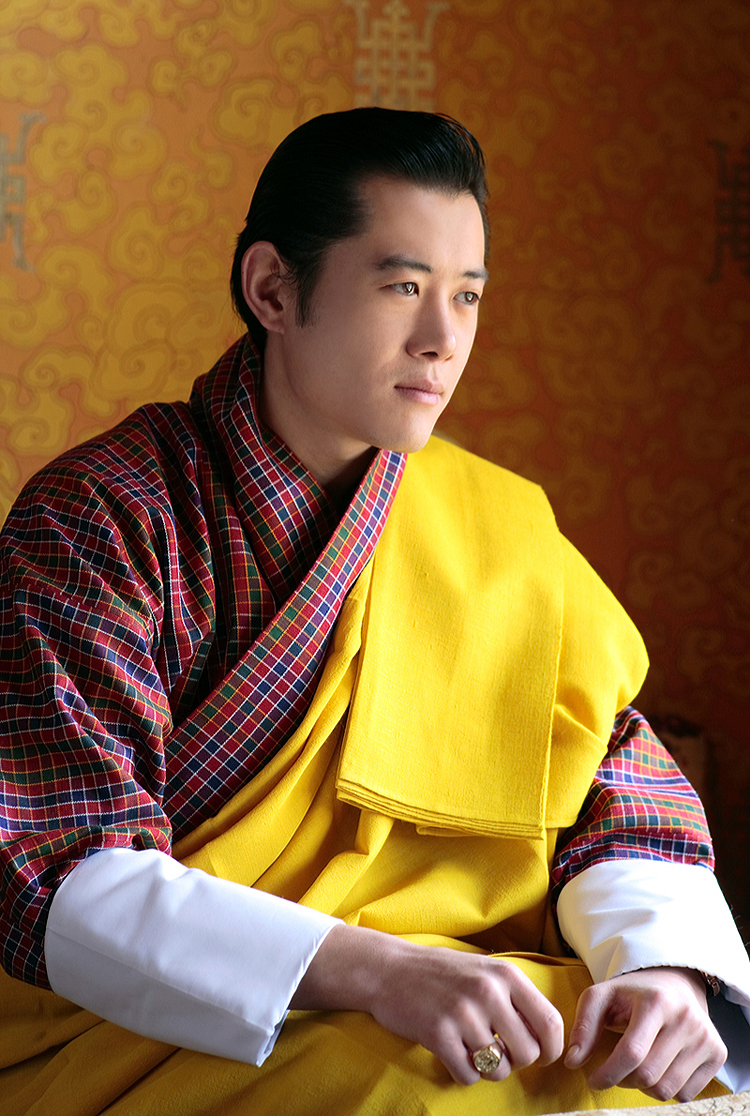
5th King of the House of Wangchuck of Bhutan – Jigme Khesar Namgyel Wangchuck.

The fourth king, who had established the National Assembly in 1953, devolved all executive powers to a council of ministers elected by the people in 1998. He introduced a system of voting no confidence in the king, which empowered the parliament to remove the monarch. The National Constitution Committee in Thimphu started drafting the Constitution of the Kingdom of Bhutan in 2001. In 2005, the fourth king of Bhutan announced his decision to hand over the reins of his kingdom to his son Prince Jigme Khesar Namgyal Wangchuk. The coronation of the king was held in Thimphu at the refurbished Changlimithang Stadium and coincided with the centenary of the establishment of the House of Wangchuck. In 2008, this paved way for the transition from absolute monarchic rule to a parliamentary democratic constitutional monarchy, with Thimphu as the headquarters of the new government, with the national defined objective of achieving "Gross National Happiness" (GNH) concomitant with the growth of Gross National Product (GNP).

== Geography and climate ==
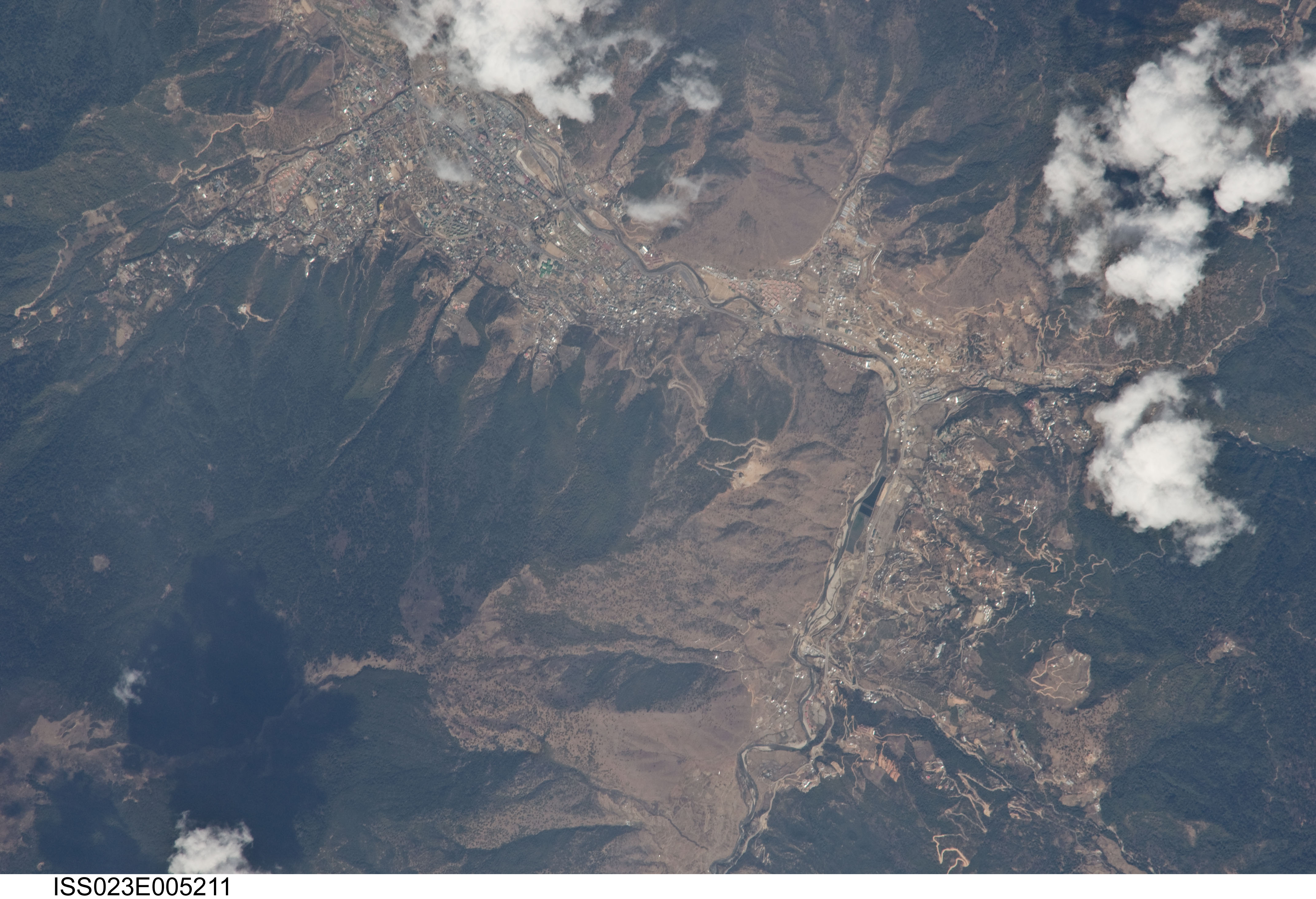
Satellite view of Thimphu

Thimphu is situated in the constricted, linear valley of the Raidāk River, which is also known as the Thimphu River (Thim Chuu or Wangchhu). While the surrounding hills are in an altitudinal range of 2,000 to 3,800 metres (6,562–12,467 feet) (warm temperate climate between 2,000 to 3,000 metres (6,562–9,843 feet) and cold temperate zone between 3,000–3,800 metres (9,843–12,467 feet)), the city itself has an altitude range varying between 2,248 metres (7,375 feet) and 2,648 metres (8,688 feet). It is these two variations in altitude and climate which determine the habitable zones and vegetation typology for the valley. The valley, however, is thinly-forested and is spread out to the north and west. At the southern end of the city, the Lungten Zampa bridge connects the east and west banks of the Wang Chuu which flows through the heart of city.

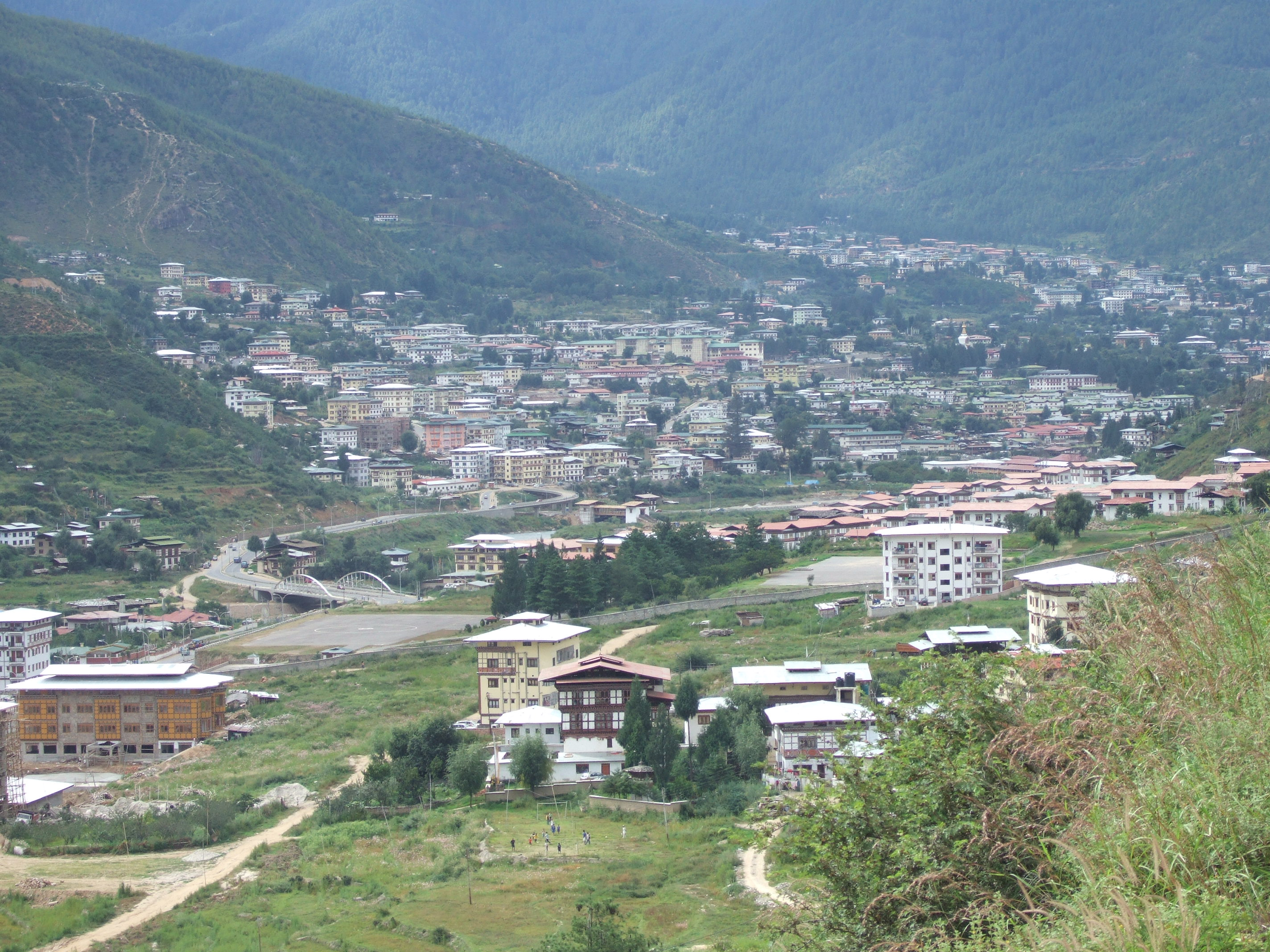
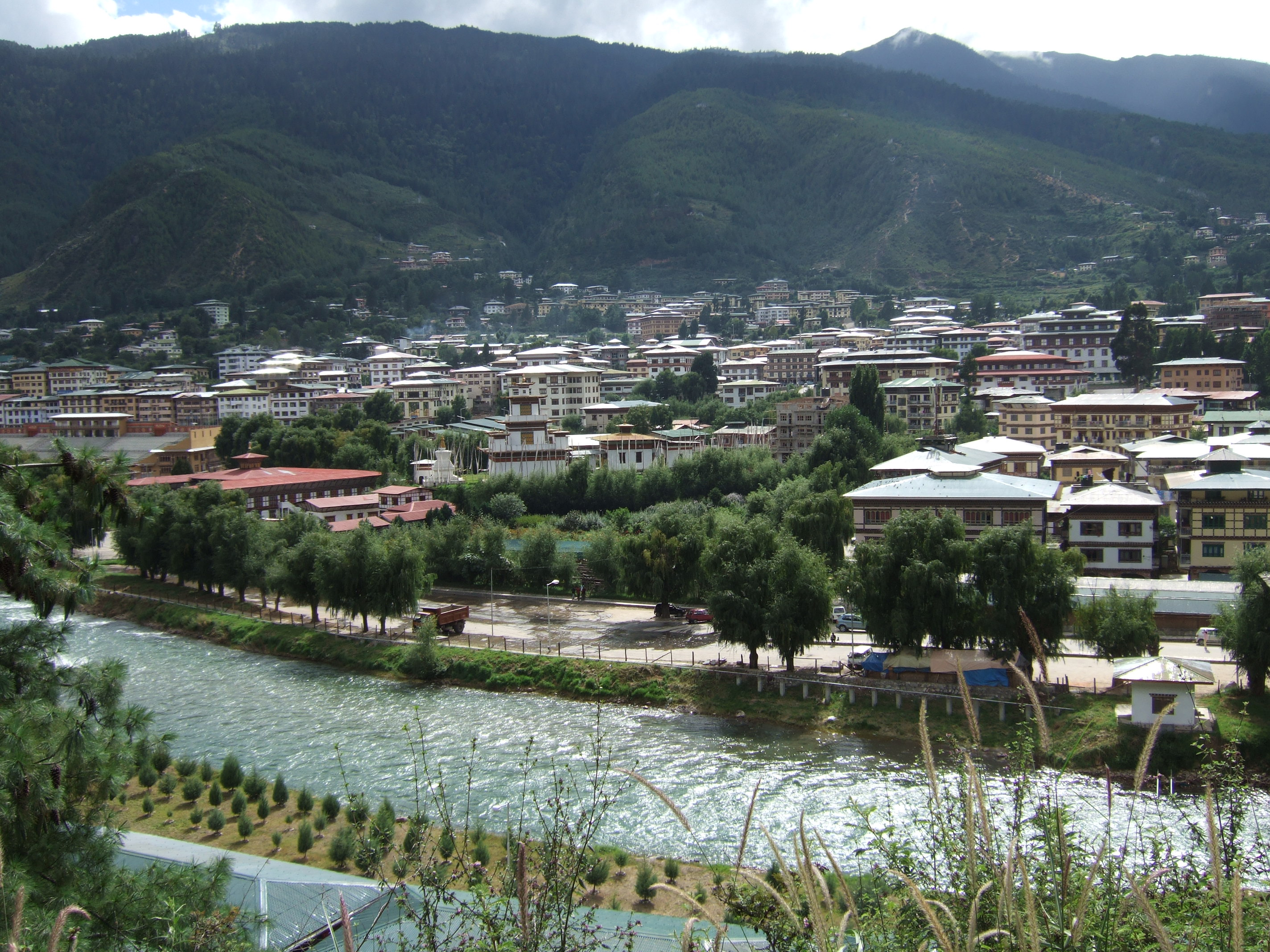
Left: View of Thimphu from the southeast. Right: the Raidāk River

The Raidāk River raises in the snow fields at an altitude of about 7,000 metres (23,000 ft). It has many tributaries that flow from the Himalayan peaks that largely dictate the topography of the Thimphu valley. The Thimphu valley, so formed, is delimited by a steep eastern ridge that rises from the riverbed and a valley formation with gradually sloping topography, extending from Dechencholing and Simtokha, on the western banks of the Raidāk. The north–south orientation of the hill ranges of the valley means that they are exposed to moist monsoon winds which engulf the inner Himalayas and its lower valleys. However, the windward and leeward sides of the hill ranges have different vegetation patterns depending on the varying rainfall incidence in the two sides. Thimphu Valley, lying in the leeward side of the mountains, is comparatively dry and contains a different type of vegetation as compared to the windward side. Hence, the coniferous vegetation in the valley is attributed to this phenomenon. Punakha, the old capital of Bhutan, is on the windward side with broad-leaved trees dominating the topography.

The city experiences a southwest monsoon-influenced subtropical highland climate (Cwb). The southwest monsoon rainfall occurs during mid-April to September. Lightning and thunder often precedes rainfall in the region with cumulonimbus clouds and light showers dominating the weather. Continuous rainfall for several days occurs resulting in landslides and blockage of roads. Streams and rivers swell up carrying huge amounts of debris from forests. Deep puddles, thick mud, and landslides along roads form barriers to transportation. Cold winds, low temperatures at night, and moderate temperatures during the day, cloudiness, light showers and snowfall mark winter weather in this zone. Fog causes poor visibility, which poses a threat to vehicular traffic in the city. As spring approaches, the landscape is marked by violent winds and relatively dry and clear skies.

Thimphu

Climate chart (precipitation, max. and min. temperature)
J	F	M	A	M	J	J	A	S	O	N	D
6.3 15 −2	9.2 17 0	20 19 4	30 22 8	50 25 12	98 27 15	153 27 17	121 27 16	74 26 15	43 24 9	1.2 20 3	3.7 17 −1
- █ Average max. and min. temperatures in °C
- █ Precipitation totals in mm
Imperial conversion
J	F	M	A	M	J	J	A	S	O	N	D
0.2 59 28	0.4 62 33	0.8 67 39	1.2 72 46	2 77 53	3.8 80 60	6 81 62	4.8 81 61	2.9 79 58	1.7 75 48	0 67 38	0.1 62 31
- █ Average max. and min. temperatures in °F
- █ Precipitation totals in inches

Climate data for Thimphu-Simtokha, elevation 2,310 m (7,580 ft), (1996–2017 normals)
Month	Jan	Feb	Mar	Apr	May	Jun	Jul	Aug	Sep	Oct	Nov	Dec	Year
Record high °C (°F)	24.0 (75.2)	25.0 (77.0)	28.0 (82.4)	30.0 (86.0)	32.2 (90.0)	32.0 (89.6)	33.0 (91.4)	32.5 (90.5)	31.0 (87.8)	31.0 (87.8)	27.0 (80.6)	24.0 (75.2)	33.0 (91.4)
Mean daily maximum °C (°F)	14.8 (58.6)	16.6 (61.9)	19.3 (66.7)	22.4 (72.3)	24.8 (76.6)	26.7 (80.1)	27.0 (80.6)	27.3 (81.1)	26.0 (78.8)	23.7 (74.7)	19.7 (67.5)	16.6 (61.9)	22.1 (71.7)
Daily mean °C (°F)	6.3 (43.3)	8.5 (47.3)	11.6 (52.9)	15.1 (59.2)	18.2 (64.8)	21.0 (69.8)	21.8 (71.2)	21.7 (71.1)	20.3 (68.5)	16.3 (61.3)	11.5 (52.7)	7.9 (46.2)	15.0 (59.0)
Mean daily minimum °C (°F)	−2.2 (28.0)	0.3 (32.5)	3.8 (38.8)	7.9 (46.2)	11.6 (52.9)	15.3 (59.5)	16.5 (61.7)	16.1 (61.0)	14.6 (58.3)	9.0 (48.2)	3.2 (37.8)	−0.8 (30.6)	8.0 (46.4)
Record low °C (°F)	−8.5 (16.7)	−7.0 (19.4)	−7.0 (19.4)	−2.0 (28.4)	2.5 (36.5)	8.0 (46.4)	11.0 (51.8)	9.0 (48.2)	6.0 (42.8)	−3.0 (26.6)	−6.0 (21.2)	−7.5 (18.5)	−8.5 (16.7)
Average rainfall mm (inches)	6.3 (0.25)	9.2 (0.36)	20.4 (0.80)	29.9 (1.18)	49.8 (1.96)	97.7 (3.85)	152.8 (6.02)	120.8 (4.76)	73.9 (2.91)	43.1 (1.70)	1.2 (0.05)	3.7 (0.15)	608.9 (23.97)
Average rainy days	1.1	1.2	3.8	6.2	8.7	14.2	19.0	16.7	11.7	4.7	0.3	0.7	88.3
Average relative humidity (%)	68.6	62.6	62.8	60.2	63.2	67.0	72.7	72.2	71.2	66.6	62.1	64.0	66.1
Source 1: National Center for Hydrology and Meteorology
Source 2: World Meteorological Organization (rainy days 1996–2018)

== Demographics ==
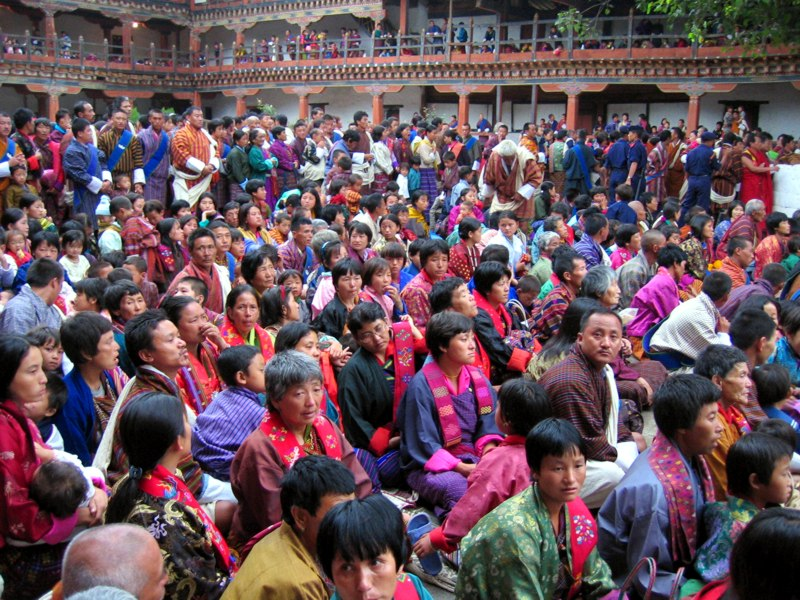
Bhutanese people

According to the census of 31 May 2005, the population of the city was 79,185 with a density of 3,029 per square kilometre (7,850/sq mi), with 92,929 over an area of 1,843 square kilometres (712 mi^{2}) in the entire district; the corresponding figure projected in 2010 for the district was 104,200. In 2011, the city's population was about 91,000.

== Urban structure ==
=== Demkhongs ===
==== Changangkha ====
Changangkha is a western central district, located between the Chubachu centre and Motithang to the west. It contains the Changangkha Lhakhang. Changangkha Temple is one of the oldest temples in the Thimphu valley, founded by Phajo Drugom Zhigpo, founder of the Drukpa Lineage in Bhutan, and extended by his son Nyima in the 13th century. The temple houses a statue of Thousand-armed Avalokiteśvara as well as very large prayer wheels and unusually large size sacred scriptures. The temple was restored in 1998–99. A well known incense factory, named Nado Poedzokhang, is located above the Lhakhang in Changangkha.

==== Changzamtok ====
Changzamtok is a southern district from the main centre, bordered by the Hospital Area to the west, by Gongphel Lam and the Wang Chuu river to the east.

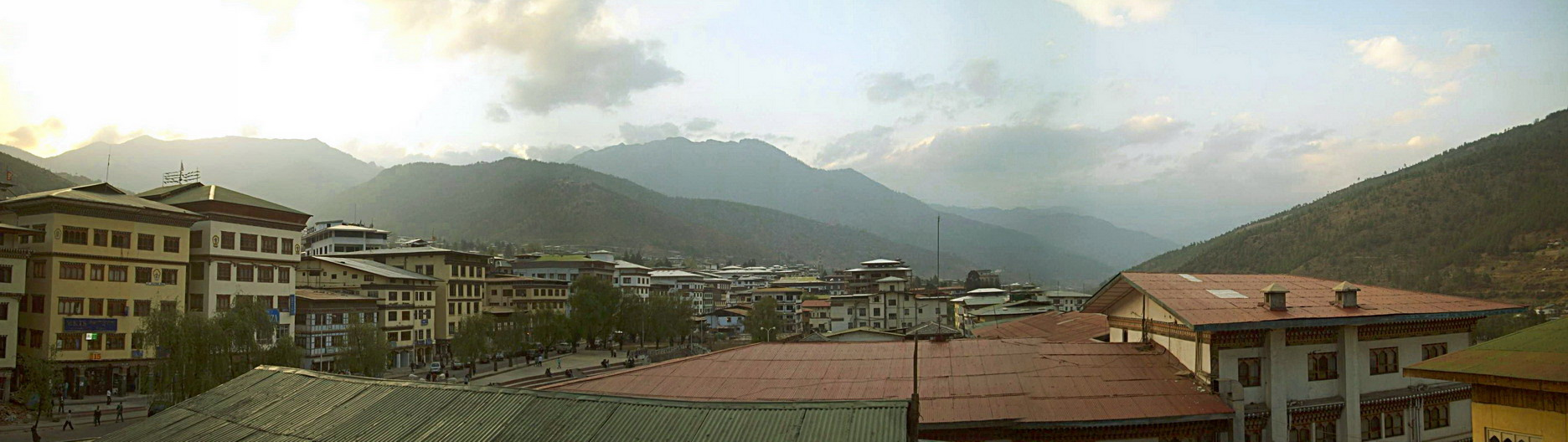
Panoramic view of Thimphu, Bhutan

==== Chubachu ====
Chubachu is the central district. It is bounded by the Chubachu River to the north, the Wang Chuu River to the east and Changangkha and Motithang to the west. Below Chubachu lies the Centenary Farmers Market which runs throughout the week. A weekend market is held on the western bank of the Wang Chu. To the west lies the Norzin Lam road which divides Chubachu from Motithang. This road contains the Bhutan Textile Museum and the National Library of Bhutan. The central road of the district is called Yanden Lam. The eastern road of the district is Chogyal Lam which runs northwest–southeast along the banks of the Wang Chu.

==== Hospital Area ====
The Hospital Area is a central district of Thimphu. Located south of the Memorial Chorten, it contains the central roundabout, JDWR Hospital and the Royal Bhutan Police national headquarters. The Gongphel Lam road divides it from Changzamthok District.

==== Jungshina ====
Jungshina is a northern district. It contains the Wangduetse Gompa.

==== Kawangjangsa ====
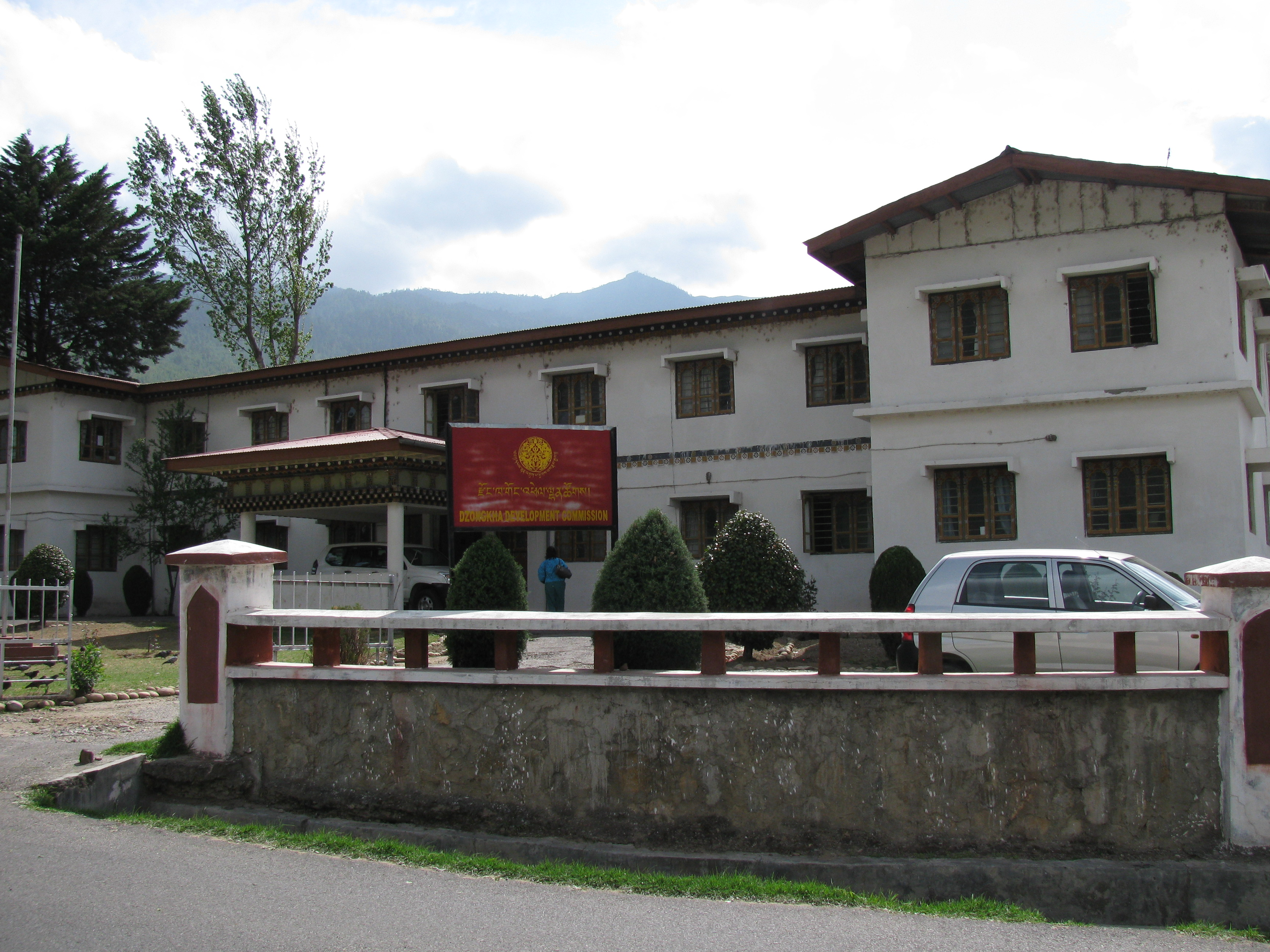
DDC Office in Kawajangsa

Kawangjangsa (or Kawajangsa) is a western district, north of Motithang, and north of the Chubachu River. The Institute of Traditional Medicine, Institute for Zorig Chusum, the National Library of Bhutan, the Folk Heritage Museum and the Bhutan Telecom Offices are located in Kawajangsa. The World Wide Fund for Nature (WWF) has its Bhutanese headquarters here; it has been responsible for facilitating tiger conservation in Bhutan.

==== Langjupakha ====
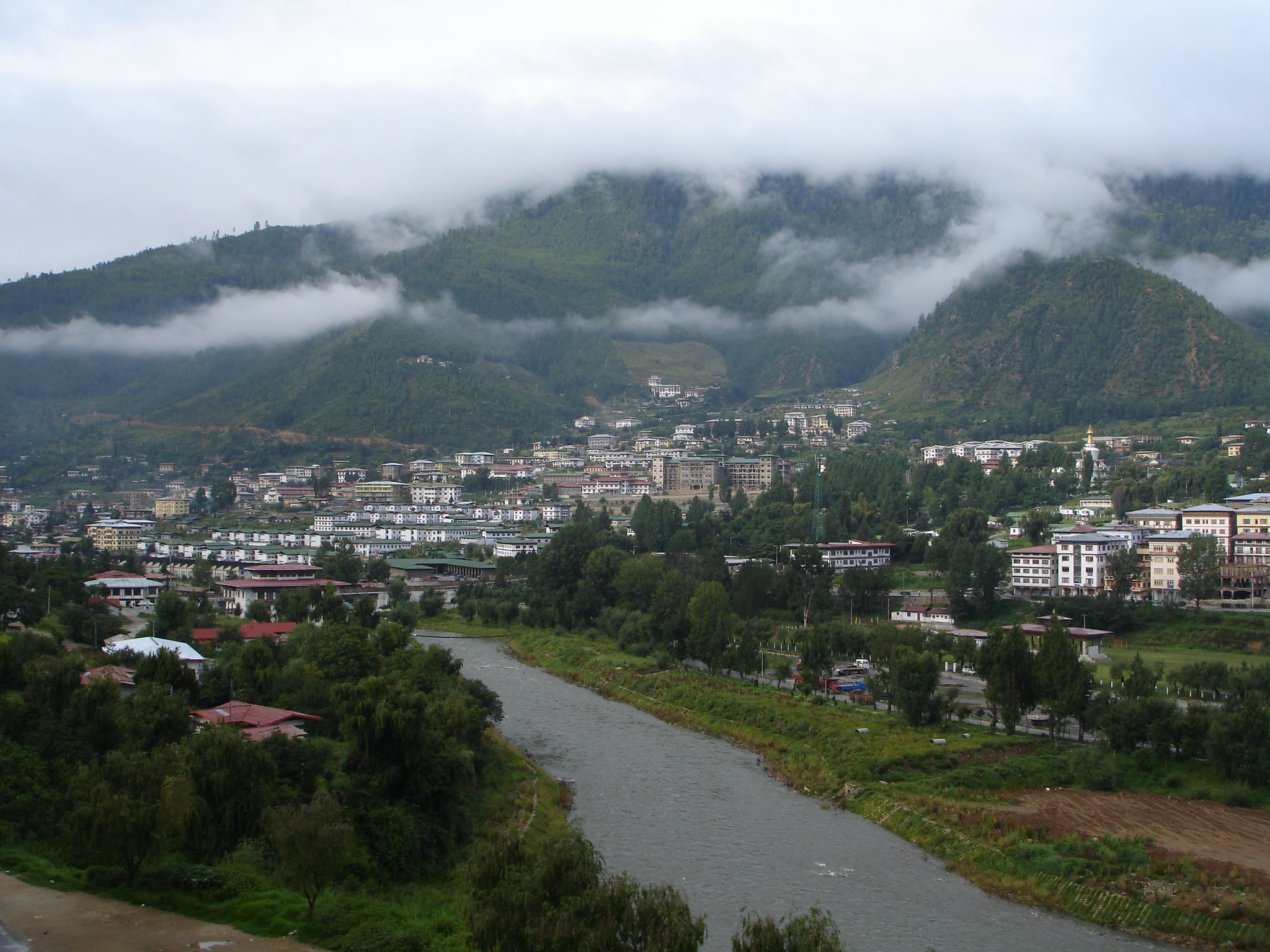
View of Thimphu from the southern part of Langjupakha in the northeastern part of the city.

Langjupakha is a northeastern district of Thimphu. Located on the eastern bank of the Wang Chuu it contains the Royal Banquet Hall, SAARC building and National Assembly and Centre for Bhutan Studies.

The SAARCC building in Thimphu was initially built for the purpose of holding the SAARC (South East Asia Association for Regional Cooperation) conference, in the early 1990s. It is located across the Wang Chuu River opposite to the Tashechho Dzong. This elegant structure is built in a fusion of Bhutanese and modern architecture with high tech facilities. It presently houses the Ministries of Planning and Foreign Affairs. The National Assembly, which used to meet in the Tashechhoe Dzong until 1993, is now held in this building in an elaborately decorated assembly hall at the end of two long decorated corridors. The National Assembly meets here twice a year. The banquet hall is also close by.

==== Motithang ====
Motithang is a north-western district of Thimphu. The Chubachu River divides the district from Kawajangsa further north and Chubachu district lies to the east.

Meaning "the meadow of pearls", the area only developed as a residential area in the 1980s, following the initial establishment of the Hotel Motithang in 1974, on the occasion of the coronation of Jigme Singye Wangchuck. At the time, the hotel was located in the middle of forest, separated from the city by farmland but today this area has grown up with houses and gardens.

Aside from the Motithang Hotel, the district contains several notable state guest houses such as the Kungacholing and Lhundupling, Rapten Apartments and the Amankora Thimphu. It also contains the National Commission for Cultural Affairs, a UNICEF station and several grocery stores, including the Lhatshog supermarket. Schools include Motithang Higher Secondary School and Jigme Namgyal School. Other buildings in Mottithang are the Royal Bodyguard Camp and the Youth Centre.

There is also a notable takin wildlife sanctuary in the district, named Motithang Takin Preserve.

==== Sangyegang ====
Sangyegang is a western district, north of the Chubachu River but south of Zilukha. It contains the Sangyegang Telecom Tower and a golf course to the east which expands north in the Zilukha part of the city.

==== Yangchenphug ====
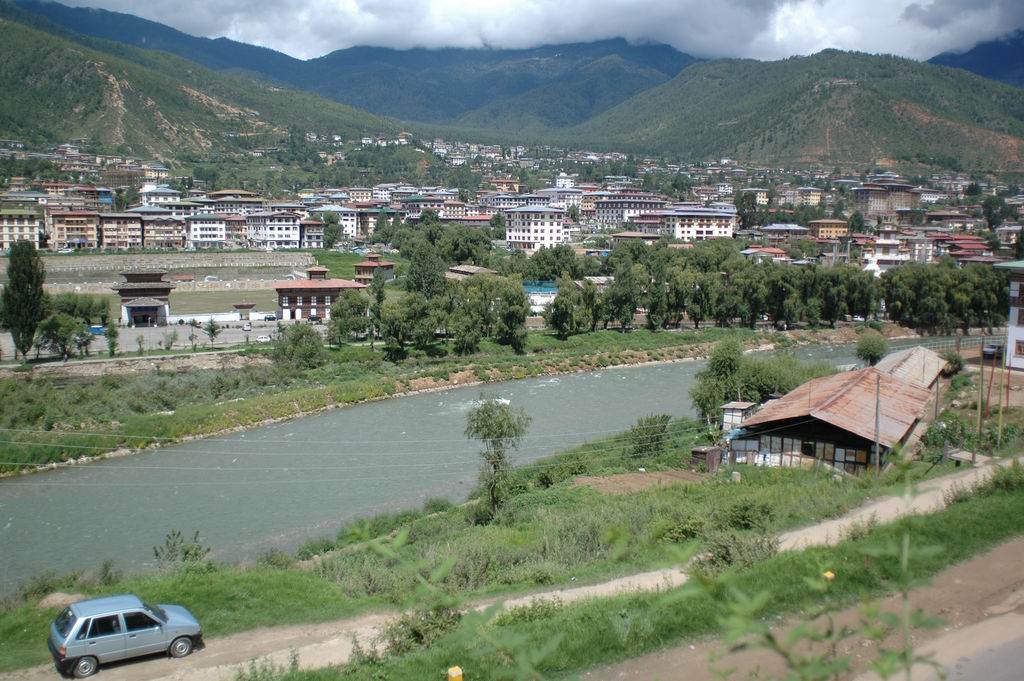
Looking across the river towards the main town from Yangchenphug

Yangchenphug is an eastern district, located across the Wang Chu River from the city centre and contains the Lungten Zampa Middle School and Yangchenphug High School. The main road is Dechen Lam which follows the line of the river and connects the district to Zamazingka in the south.

==== Zamazingka ====
Zamazingka is an eastern district, located across the Wang Chu River from the city centre. The main road is Dechen Lam, which follows the line of the river and connects the district to Yangchenphug in the north and eventually leads to Paro to the south.

==== Zilukha ====
Zilukha is a northern district, located between Jungshina to the north and Sangyegang to the south. It contains the Drubthob Gonpa/Zilukha Nunnery once belonged to the Drubthob (Realized one) Thang Thong Gyalpo often referred to as The King of the open field. In the early 15th century with his multiple talents he popularly became the Leonardo da Vinci of the Great Himalayas. The place also has a great view of the majestic, Tashi Chhoe Dzong (Fortress of Glorious Religion) and government cottages nearby. A golf course spans much of the district flanking the lower eastern part.

=== City planning ===
Thimphu was selected to be the capital of Bhutan in 1952 but was not officially established as capital of Bhutan until 1961. It was then a hamlet of a few houses built, around the Tashichhoe Dzong. The city has expanded slowly over the years along river banks and on high ground. Lower plains along the river have also been occupied. It was only after the country was opened for foreign visitors that it grew rapidly. Thimphu is now a major city with all civic amenities such as well planned wide roads with traffic police controlling the traffic, banks, hotels and restaurants, institutions of arts, culture, media, sports and also the traditional dzongs, monasteries and chortens. Consequently, a boom in property value in Thimphu has been reported.

The residential area of the city constitutes 38.3% of the total area. In the non-residential area, 9.3% of the city consists of administrative buildings, 4% of commercial establishments, 10.1% is taken up by health, educational or institutional structures, 2% by industrial establishments and 3.8% by security. The remaining 32.5% of the city constitutes dispersed open spaces with vacant lands, which need to be preserved in any future planning and expansion.

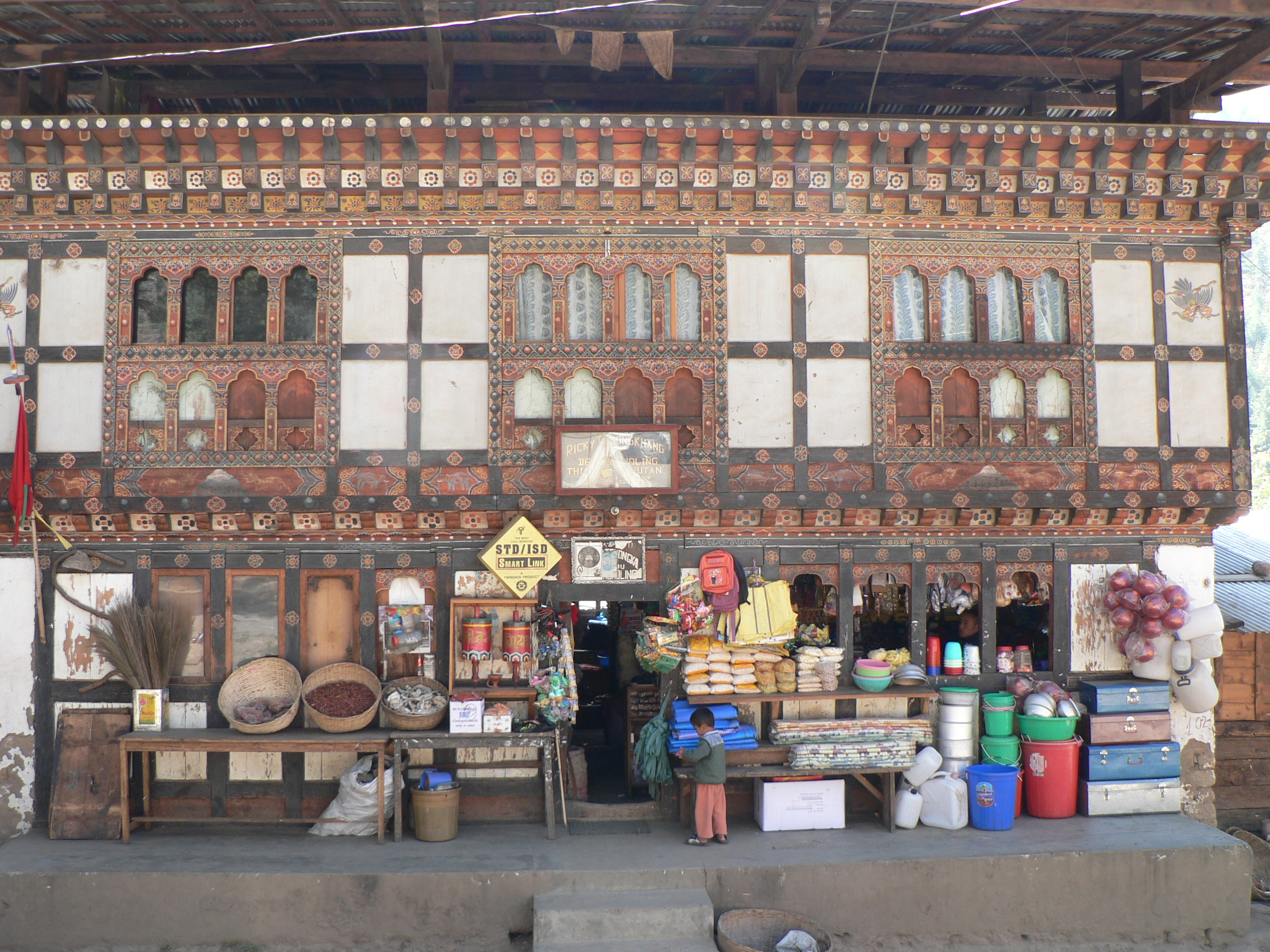
Shops in the lower market of Thimphu.

The Thimphu Structure Plan is a modern urban development plan for the Thimphu city, evolved in 1998, with the objective of protecting the fragile ecology of the valley, including its rivers and forests. This planning was necessitated due to growth of automobiles and pressure on the public health infrastructure in the town centre, restrictions imposed on plot coverage and building heights. The plan was approved by the Council of Ministers in 2003. An elected body, the Thimphu Municipal Corporation, is implementing the plan, drawn up by the American architect Christopher Charles Benninger. This plan is estimated to cost more than $1 billion when completed. Funds for implementation of the plan are being provided by the World Bank and the Asian Development Bank. There are some disputed areas between land owners and stakeholders, which has resulted in the World Bank and the Asian Development Bank requesting the Ministry of Works and Human Settlement (MOWHS) to resolve the issues through a process of the agreement, before further funds are released.

The clear planning concepts that have been established within the 'Structured Plan' are: the Tashichheo Dzong, Wang Chuu and the streams, Green Hills and their Forest cover, monasteries, temples, chortens and prayer flags, the urban core, urban villages and the urban corridor. The southern entrance of the city at Simtokha Dzong anchors the city limits with the Northern and Western limits of the Wang Chuu Valley.

Under a development plan for 2027, much of the city will be car-free pedestrian zones filled with arcaded walkways, plazas, courtyards, cafes, and exhibitions, with automobile traffic confined to the edges of the city. Parks and footpaths will be developed along riverfronts, and no construction will be allowed within 30 metres (98 feet) of a river or stream. City planners also announced that the rule that buildings be constructed to reflect traditional Bhutanese architecture, which was often violated in the past, would be enforced more strictly. Many of the economic activities that take place in the city, along with military and police infrastructure, would be moved. It is expected that by this time, the city's population will have increased to 162,000.

=== Urban expansion ===
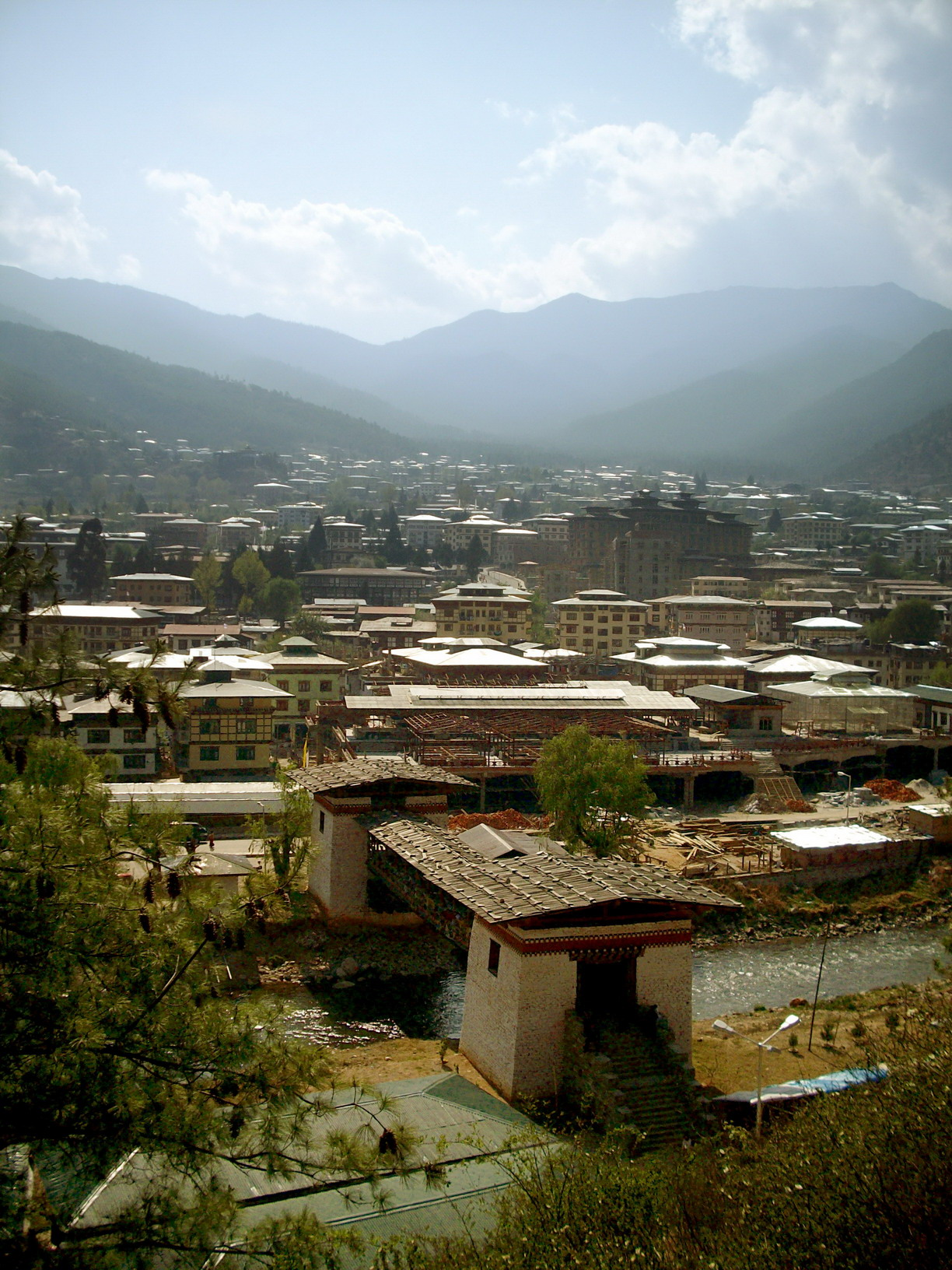
Urban expansion in Thimphu

Over the last 50 years, since its establishment as the capital of Bhutan, Thimphu has witnessed expansion, initially at a slow pace, then rapidly after the country was opened up to the outside world after the coronation of the fourth King, Jigme Singye Wangchuck. Broadly, the city's natural systems are under three categories: natural (forest, bush cover, river, and watersheds), agricultural (orchards, rice paddies, grazing lands) and recreational (public open space, parks, stadium).

The urban expansion has seen a structured development plan for 2027. The buildings will continue to be built to retain ancient Bhutanese culture and architectural styles but with a measured and modulated blend of modern development, meeting requirements of national and civic administration and all basic civic amenities such as roads, water supply and drainage, hospitals, schools and colleges, electricity, media centres and so forth. The monuments or buildings of note are the sprawling Tashichho Dzong, built like a fortress, which is the centre of Bhutanese administration as well as monastic centre, the Memorial Chorten, Thimphu and the National Assembly of the newly formed parliamentary democracy within the monarchic rule. The Palace of the King located to the north of the city, called the Dechencholing Palace, the official residence of the King, is an impressive structure that provides a grand aerial view of the city.

Rapid expansion following the pattern of rural exodus has resulted in considerable rebuilding in the city centre and mushrooming of suburban development elsewhere. Norzin Lam, the recently upgraded main thoroughfare, is lined with shops, restaurants, retail arcades and public buildings.

Within the core area of the city, there is a mix of apartment blocks, small family homes and family-owned stores. By regulation, all buildings are required to be designed in traditional style with Buddhist paintings and motifs. A lively weekend market near the river supplies meat, vegetables and tourist items. Most of the city's limited light industry is located south of the main bridge. Thimphu has a growing number of commercial services and offices, which provide for ever-growing local needs.

== Architecture ==
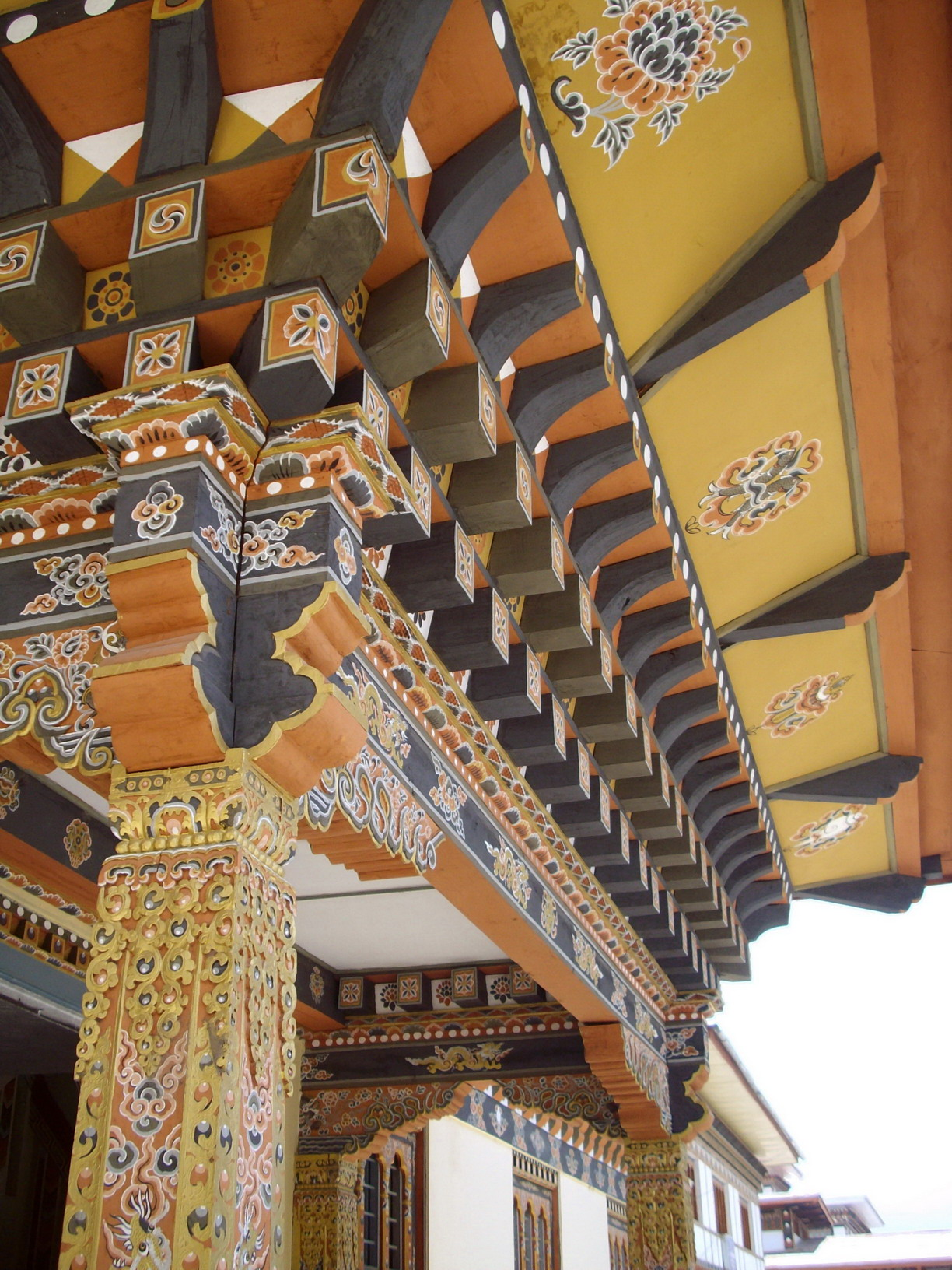
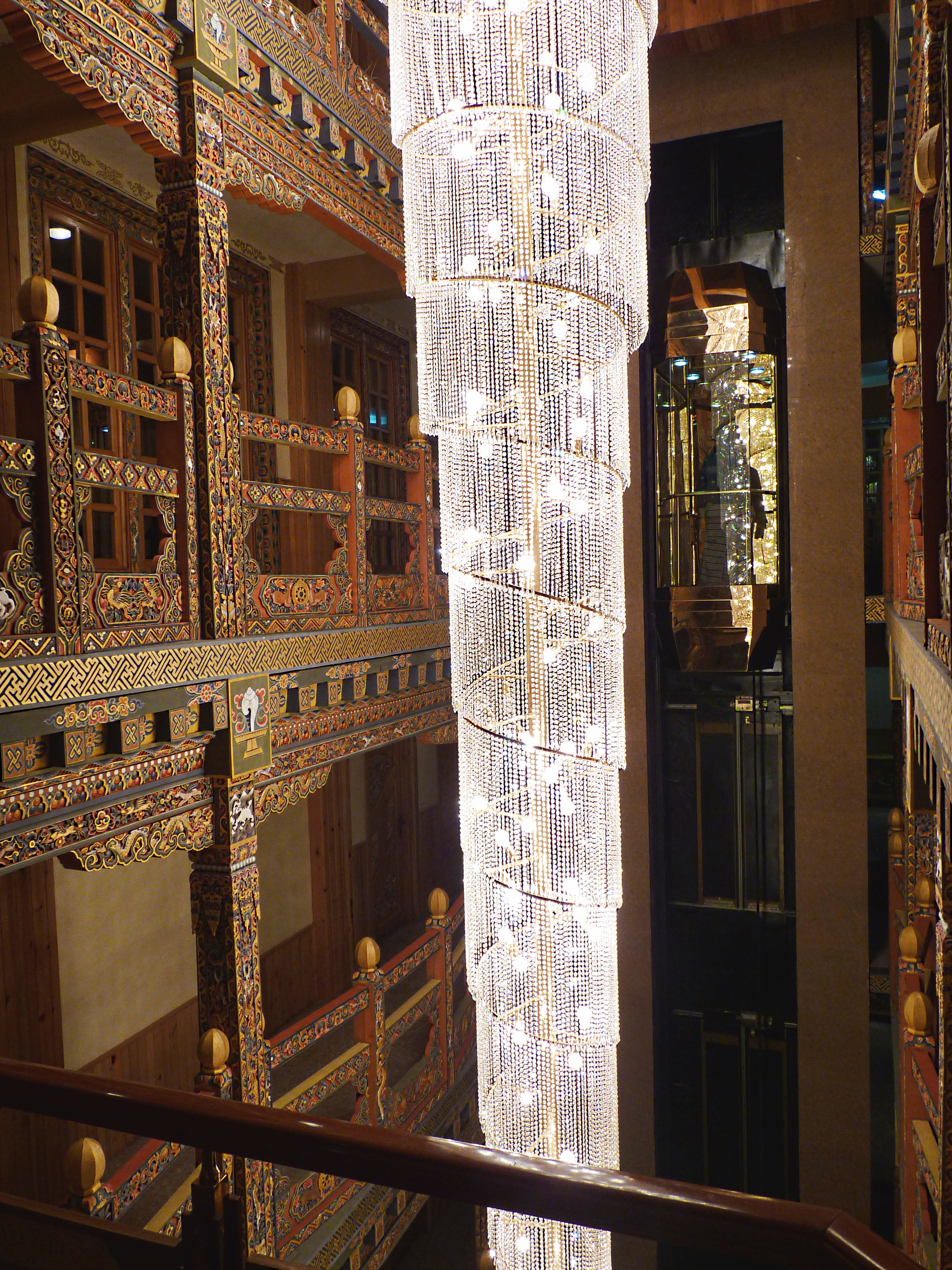
Left: A typical Bhutanese roof design. Right: Hotel interior -Blend of Traditional and Modern Bhutan.

The traditional architectural monuments in Thimphu, as in the rest of Bhutan, are of typical Bhutanese architecture of monasteries, dzongs (most striking fortress type structures), chortens, gateways, Lhakhangs, other sacred places and royal palaces, which are the most distinctive architectural forms of Bhutan. Prayer Flags, Mani Walls and Prayer Wheels present a propitious setting throughout the urban agglomerate of Thimphu. The most prominent architecturally elegant, traditional Bhutanese building structures in Thimphu are the Tashichho Dzong, Drubthob Goemba (now the Zilluka nunnery), Tango Goempa or Cheri Goempa, the Memorial Chorten, Thimphu, Dechen Phodrang, and Changangkha Lhakhang, all vintage monuments with rich history.

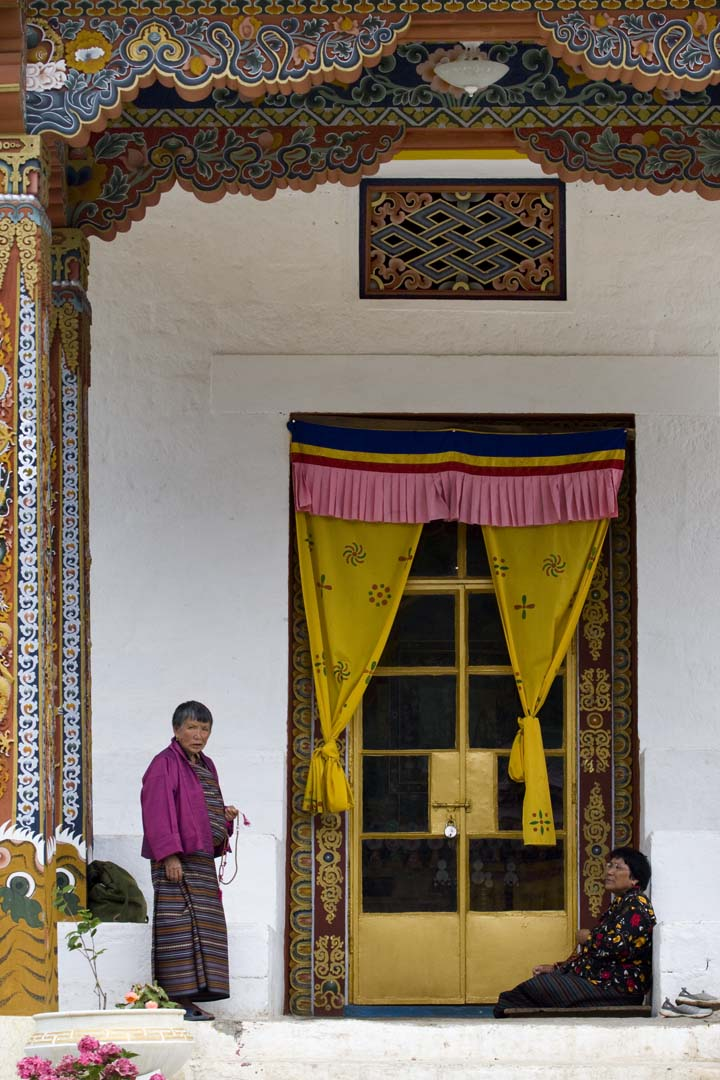
Typical Bhutanese decorated entrance door.

These are further sanctified by the recent additions to the architectural excellence of buildings, a fusion of the traditional and modern architecture which are mostly post 1962, after Thimphu became the capital of Bhutan and opened up for tourism under various Five Year Developmental Plans. The buildings under this category are the National Institute for Zorig Chusum, National Library, National Assembly cum SAARC Building, National Institute for Traditional Medicine, National Textile Museum, Voluntary Artists Studio, Royal Academy of Performing Arts, Telecom Tower and many more. The residential buildings in Thimphu have also undergone change in their construction methods without sacrificing the traditional Bhutanese designs said to be "reminiscent of Swiss Chalets."

Tashichhoe Dzong

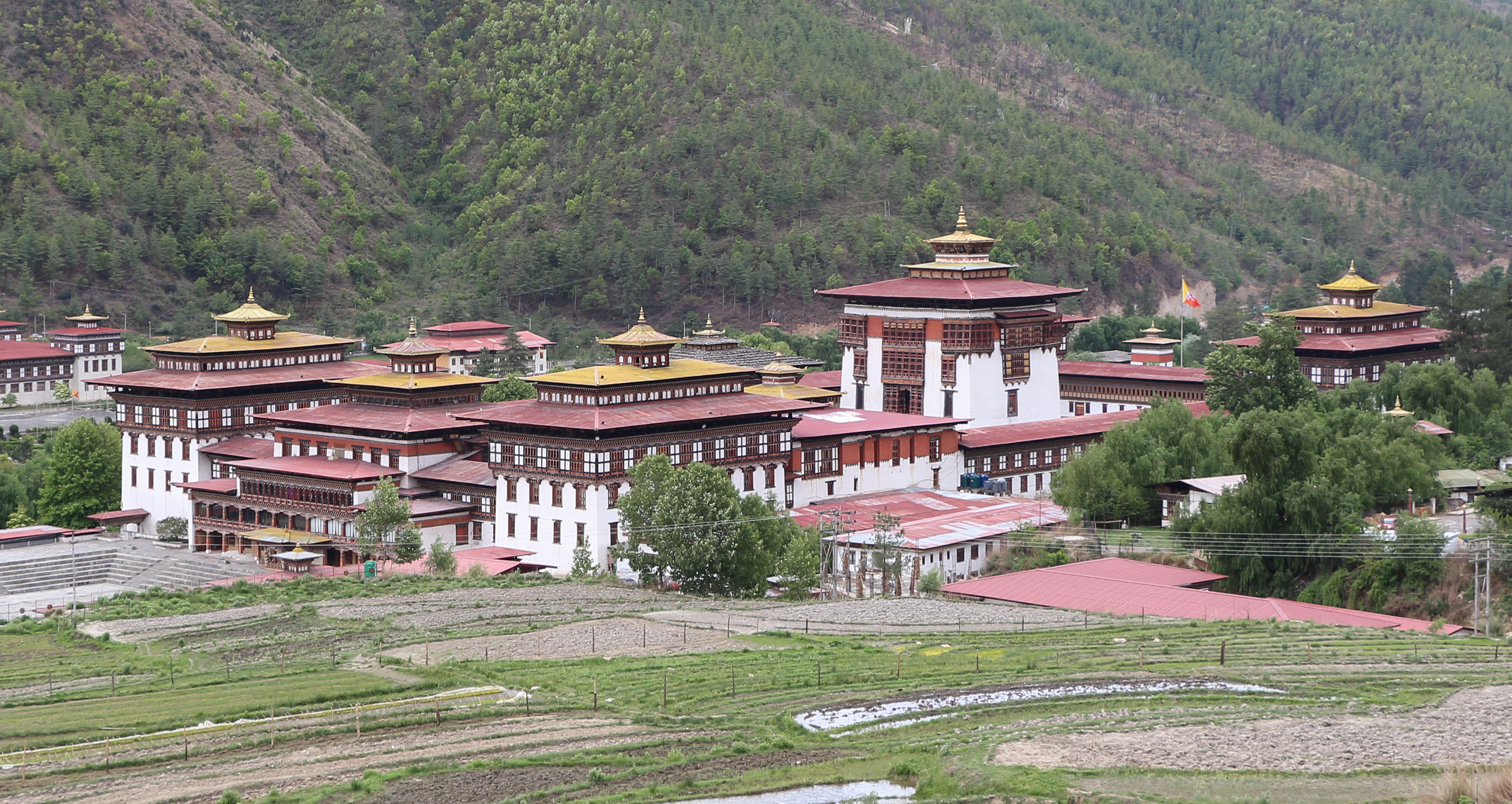
Full view of Tashichhoe Dzong, Thimphu.

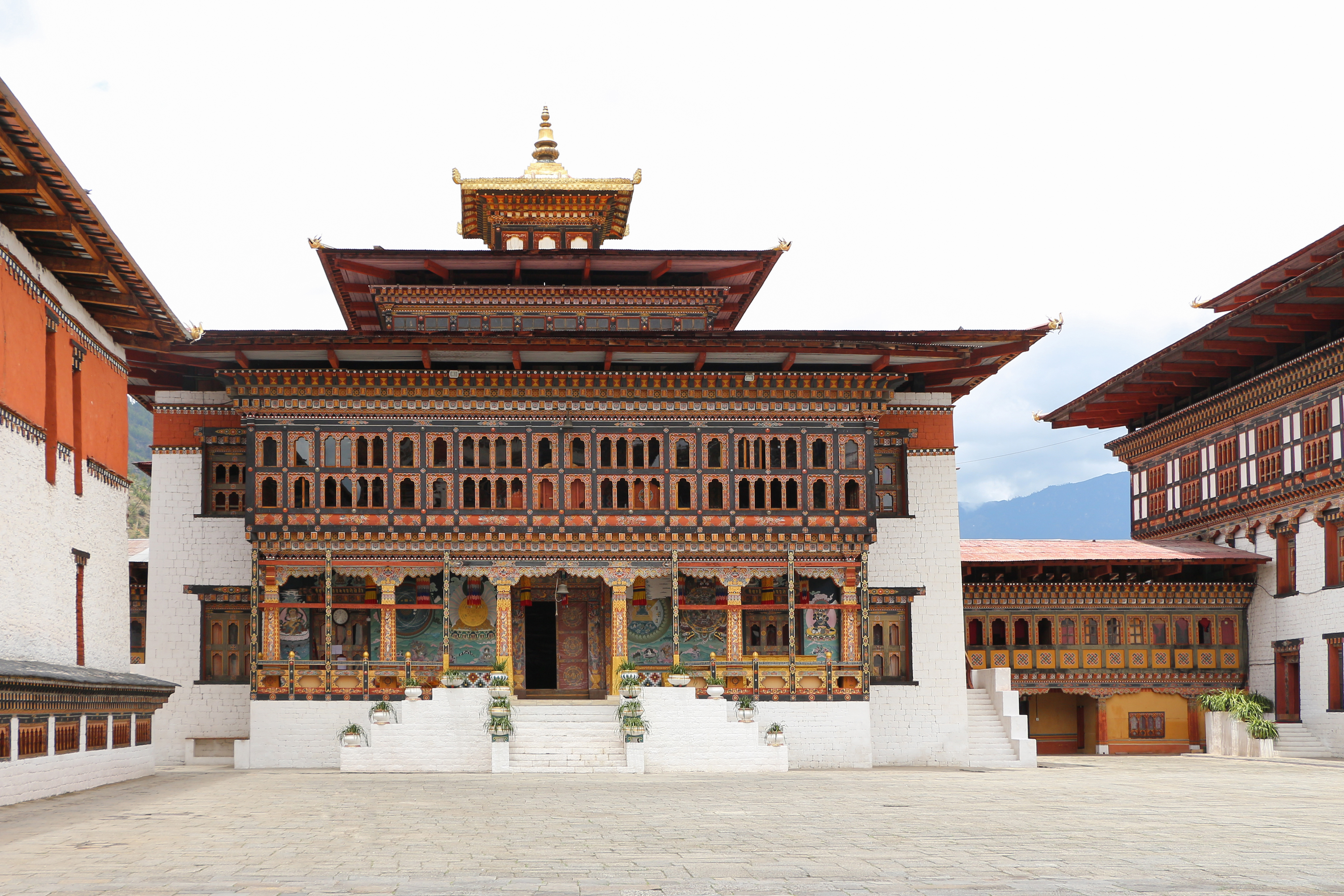
Inside view of Tashichhoe Dzong.

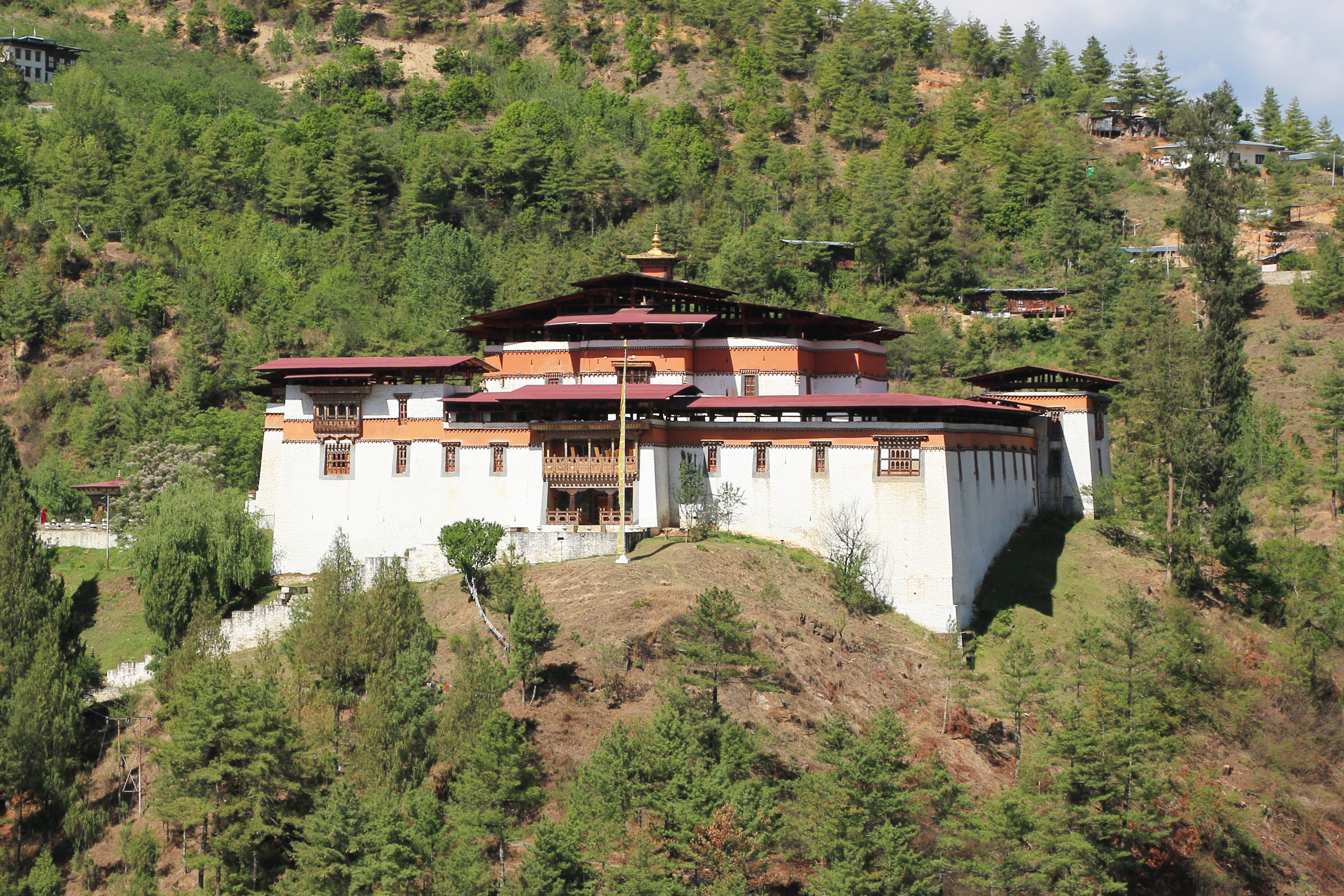
Simtokha Dzong.

The most prominent landmark in Thimphu is the Tashichho Dzong ("Fortress of the Glorious Religion") located on the west bank of the Wang Chuu. The imposing white washed structure, as seen now, has undergone several renovations over the centuries following fires and earthquakes. Subsequent to introduction of the Drukpa Kargyu lineage by Lama Phajo and Zhabdrung acquiring the Dzong in 1641, the Dzong was renamed as Tashichho Dzong. During this time the practice of using a Dzong both as a religious centre for lamas and administrative centre for civic administration was introduced. Apart from the throne room and offices of the King of Bhutan, as an administrative building, it houses the Central Secretariat, the offices of the ministries of Home Affairs and Finance. The National Assembly, which used to be located in the Dzong, is now in a separate building called the SAARC building.

Simtokha Dzong

Simtokha Dzong, known as Sangak Zabdhon Phodrang (Palace of the Profound Meaning of Secret Mantras), is said to be the oldest surviving fortress-cum-monastery in Bhutan. Established in 1629 by Zhabdrung Ngawang Namgyal, it was attacked several times in the 17th century but survived and was refurbished repeatedly. It is a small dzong (only 60 metres (200 ft) square with gate on the southern direction), located about 5 kilometres (3.1 mi) to the south of Thimphu. It now houses a Dzongkha language learning institutes.

Dechen Phodrang Monastery

Dechen Phrodrang means "Palace of Great Bliss". It is a Buddhist monastery located to the north of Thimphu. The Dzong located at the end of Gaden Lam was originally the site of Thimphu's original Tashichhoe Dzong. In 1971, it was converted into a monastic school with 450 student monks enrolled for eight-year courses. It has a staff of 15. The monastery contains a number of important historical Bhutanese artifacts including 12th century paintings monitored by UNESCO and a noted statue of Namgyal on the upper floor. In the downstairs chapel, there is a central Sakyamuni Buddha.

Dechencholing Palace

Dechencholing Palace (བདེ་ཆེན་ཆོས་གླིང་, Wylie: bde chen chos gling) is located to the northern end of the Thimphu valley on the east bank of the Thimphu Chuu. It was the residence of the late Royal Grandmother, popularly known as Gayum Phuntsho Choden Wangchuck. King Jigme Singye Wangchuck was born here on 11 November 1955, but makes his residence at the Samteling Palace (Royal Cottage).

Tango Monastery

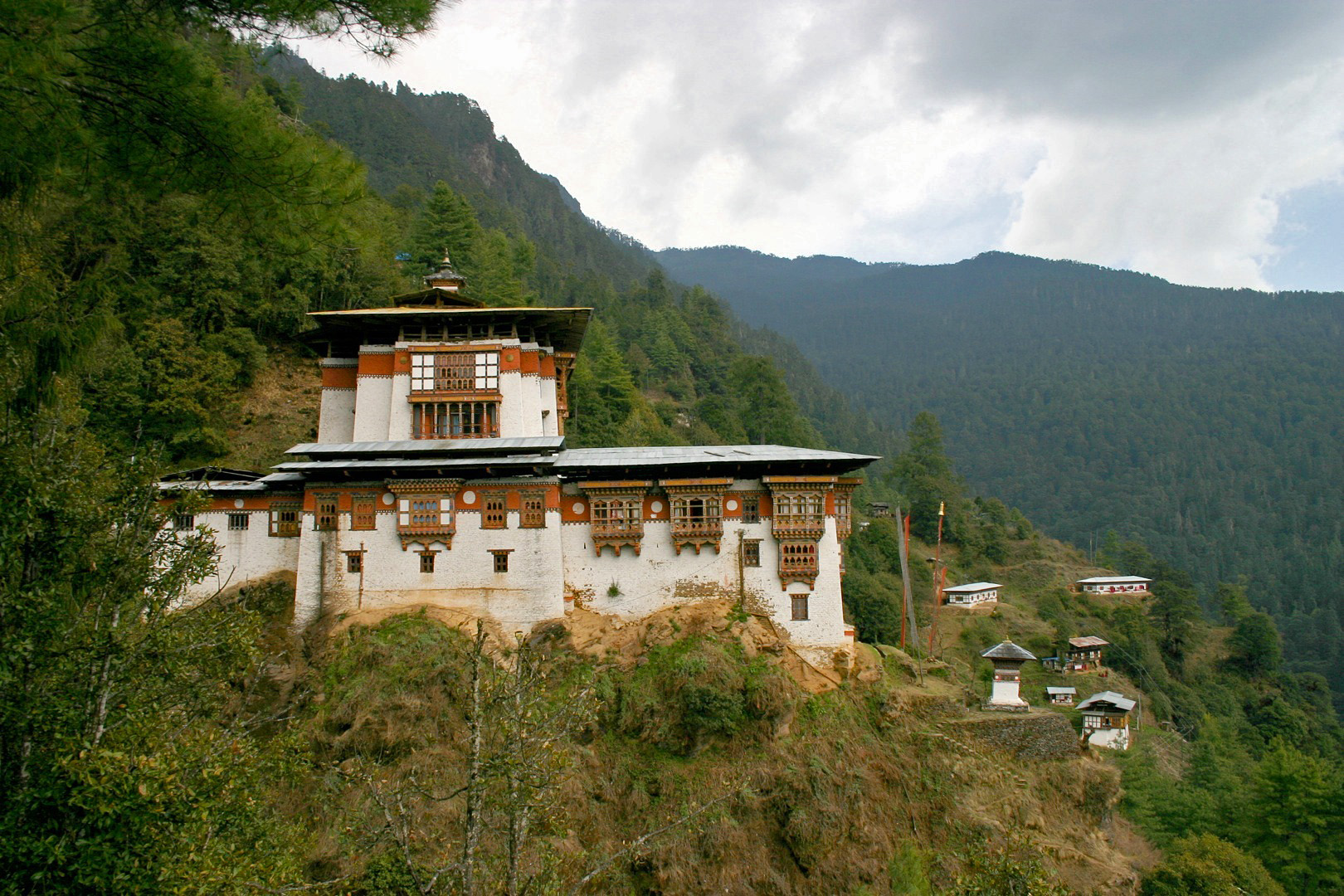
Tango Monastery in Thimphu

The Tango Monastery is located to the north of Thimphu near Cheri Mountain. It was founded by Lama Gyalwa Lhanampa in the 13th century and built in its present form by Tenzin Rabgye, the 4th Temporal Ruler in 1688. According to local legend, the location of this monastery is the holy place where Avalokiteshvara revealed himself as "the self-emanated form of the Wrathful Hayagriva". The location had been prophesied in Tibet. In 1616, the Tibetan Shabdrung Ngawang Namgyal meditated in its cave. The self-emanated form of the wrathful Hayagriva is deified in the monastery. It belongs to the Drukpa Kagyu School of Buddhism in Bhutan. The word 'Tango' in Bhutanese language means "horse head". This name conforms to the main deity Hayagriva (local name Tandin) deified in the monastery.

Tango Monastery is built in the dzong fashion, and has a curved (semi-circular) outside wall and prominent main tower with recesses. It covers the caves where originally meditation and miracles were performed by saints from the 12th century onwards. Behind the series of prayer wheels are engraved slates. Inside the courtyard is a gallery, illustrating the leaders of the Drukpa Kagyupa lineage.

Cheri Monastery

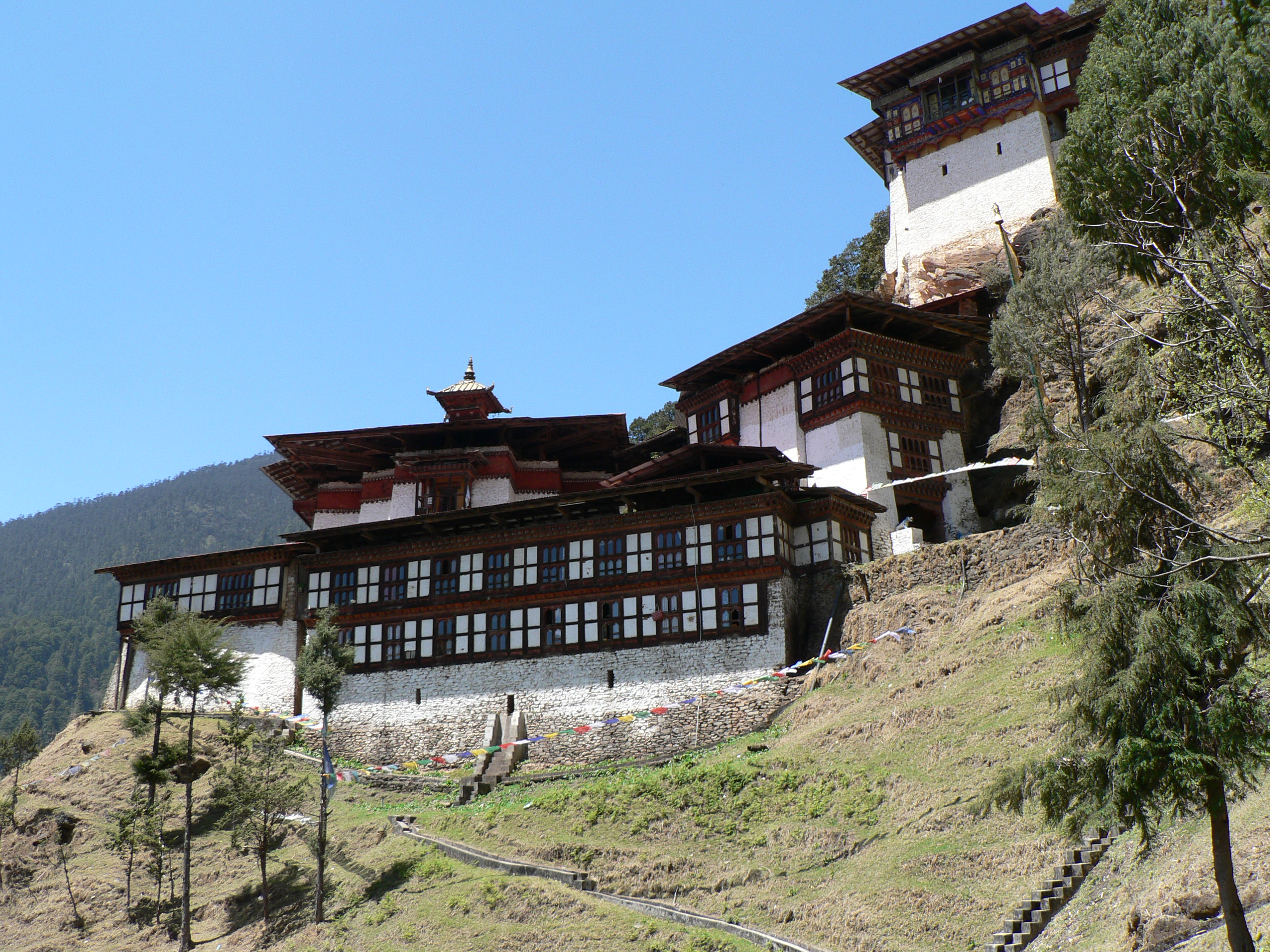
Cheri Monastery or Cheri Goempa to the north of Thimphu.

Cheri Monastery, also called Chagri Dorjeden Monastery, was established in 1620 by Zhabdrung Ngawang Namgyal. It was the first monastery established by Namgyal, at the young age of 27. Zhabdrung spent three years in strict retreat at Chagri and resided there for many periods throughout the rest of his life. It was at Chagri in 1623 that he established the first Drukpa Kagyu monastic order in Bhutan. The monastery, which is now a major teaching and retreat centre of the Southern Drukpa Kagyu order, is located at the northern end of Thimphu Valley, about 15 kilometres (9 mi) from the capital. It sits on a hill above the end of the road at Dodeyna and it takes about an hour's walk up the steep hill to reach the monastery from there. According to Bhutanese religious histories, the place was first visited by Padmasambhava in the 8th century. In the 13th century, it was visited by Phajo Drugom Zhigpo, the Tibetan Lama who first established the Drukpa Kagyu tradition in Bhutan. There is a silver chorten inside the monastery that enshrines the ashes of Zhabdrung's father.

Buddha Dordenma

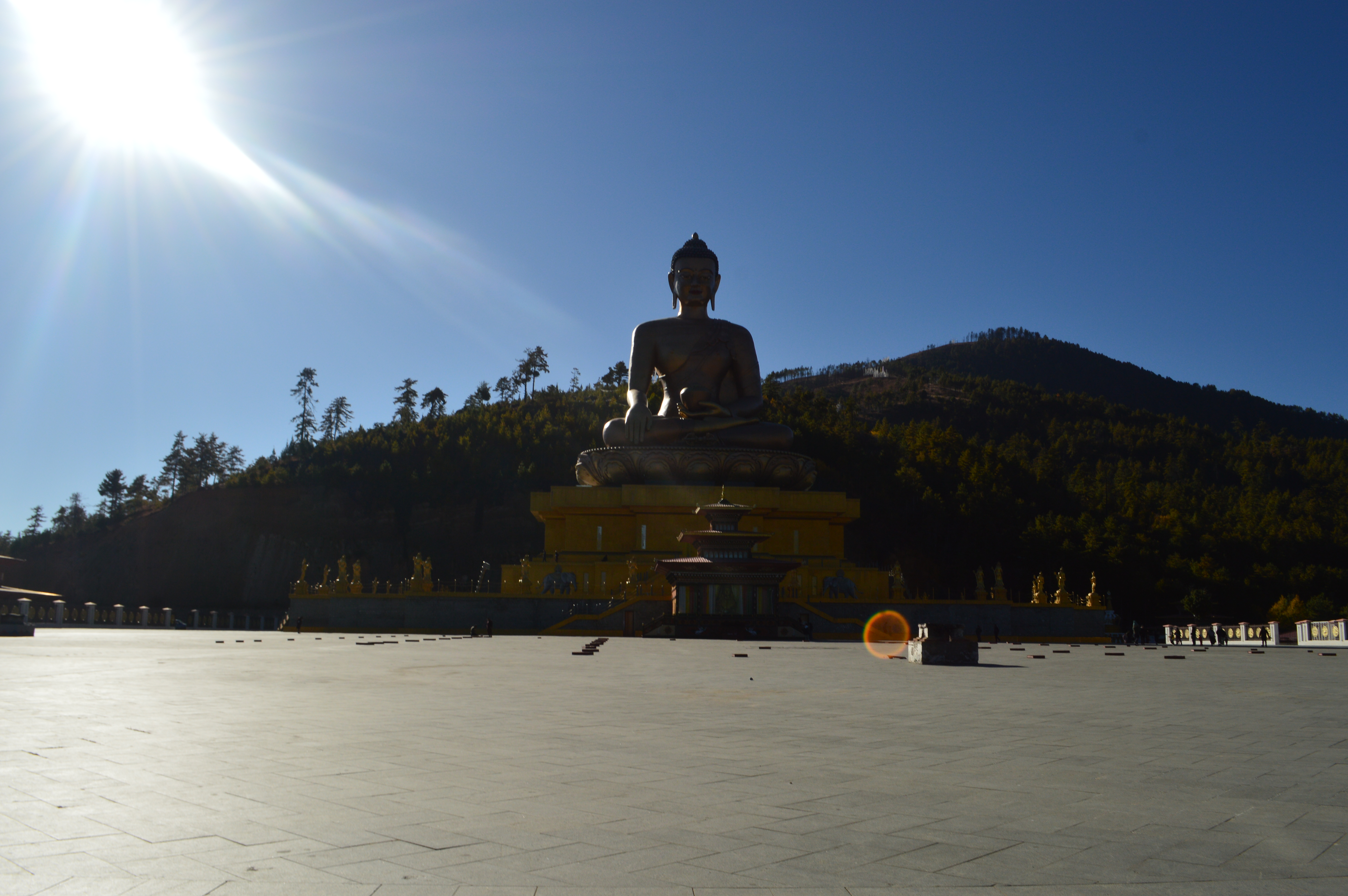
The Buddha Point

The Buddha Dordenma is a bronze statue, a 'Vajra Throne' Buddha, that is under construction amidst the ruins of Kuensel Phodrang, overlooking Thimphu city, about 100 metres (330 ft) above the Wang Chuu river bed. This location was the palace of Sherab Wangchuck, the 13th Desi Druk. It is a gigantic Shakyamuni Buddha statue under construction. The statue will house over one lakh (one hundred thousand) smaller Buddha statues, each of which, like the Buddha Dordenma itself, will be made of bronze and gilded in gold. Upon completion, it will be one of the largest Buddha rupas in the world, at a height of 51.5 metres (169 ft). The statue alone is being built at a cost of US$47 million, by Aerosun Corporation of Nanjing, China, while the total cost of the Buddha Dordenma Project is well over US$100 million. The interior will accommodate 100,000 8-inch-tall (20 cm) and 25,000 12-inch-tall (30 cm) gilded Buddhas respectively. It is planned to be completed by October 2010. Apart from commemorating the centennial of the Bhutanese monarchy, it fulfils two prophecies. In the 20th century, the renowned yogi Sonam Zangpo prophesied that a large statue of either Padmasambhava, Buddha or of a phurba would be built in the region "to bestow blessings, peace and happiness on the whole world". Additionally the statue is mentioned in the ancient terma of Guru Padmasambhava himself, said to date from approximately the 8th century, and recovered some 800 years ago by terton Pema Lingpa.

Memorial Chorten

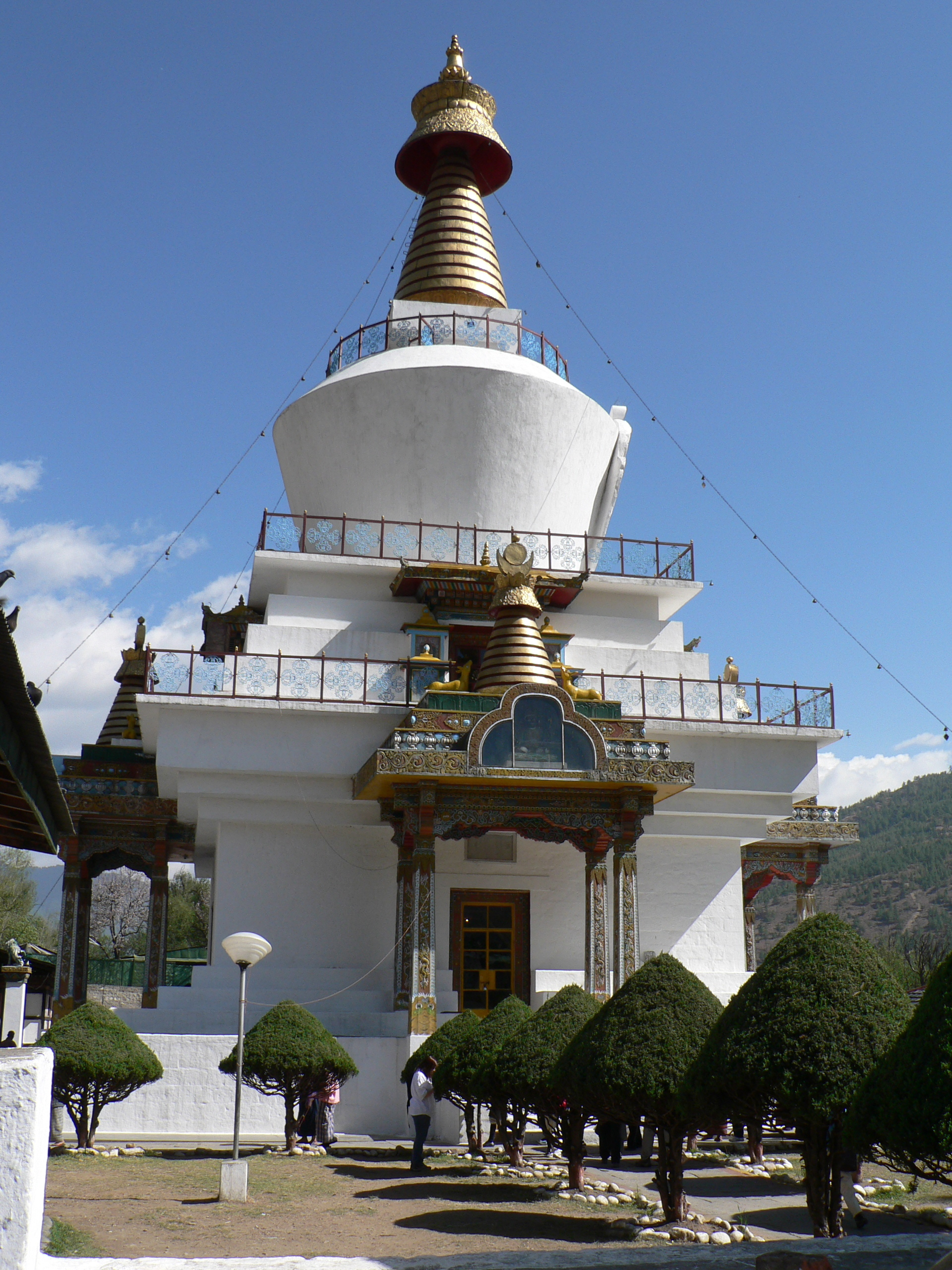
The Memorial Chorten, Thimpu

The Memorial Chorten, also known as the 'Thimphu Chorten', is a chorten in Thimphu located on Doeboom Lam in the southern-central part of the city near the main roundabout and Indian Military Hospital. The chorten that dominates the skyline of Thimphu was built in 1974 to honour the 3rd King of Bhutan, Jigme Dorji Wangchuck (1928–1972). This prominent landmark in the city has golden spires and bells. In 2008, it underwent extensive renovation. This chorten is popularly known as "the most visible religious landmark in Bhutan". It was consecrated by the Late Dudjom Rimpoche. This chorten is unlike other chortens as it does not enshrine the mortal remains of the late King. Only the King's photo in a ceremonial dress adorns a hall in the ground floor. The King, when he was alive, wanted to build "a chorten to represent the mind of the Buddha". It is designed as a Tibetan style chorten, also called as the Jangchup Chorten, patterned on the design of a classical stupa, with a pyramidal pillar crowned by a crescent of Moon and Sun. The feature that is distinct here is the outward flaring of the rounded part to give the shape of a vase, rather than a dome shape. The chorten depicts larger than life size images of tantric deities, with some 36 of them in erotic poses.

=== Other attractions ===
There are several other attractions in Thimphu such as the National Post Office, the Clock Tower Square and the Motithang Takin Preserve (an erstwhile zoo).

National Post Office and the Bhutan Postal Museum

The National Post Office, located in the north wing of the large General Post Office building on the Dremton Lam (Drentoen Lam), is where the famous Bhutan's Philatelic Bureau sells stamps and souvenir sheets of Bhutan stamps. In view of their colourful presentation and limited issue, stamp collectors all over the world know that Bhutan is the first country to diversify and export quality stamps; particularly, 3D stamps are collector's items. The Bhutan Postal Museum opened its doors in November 2015 and is housed on the groundfloor of the General Post Office building.

Clock Tower Square

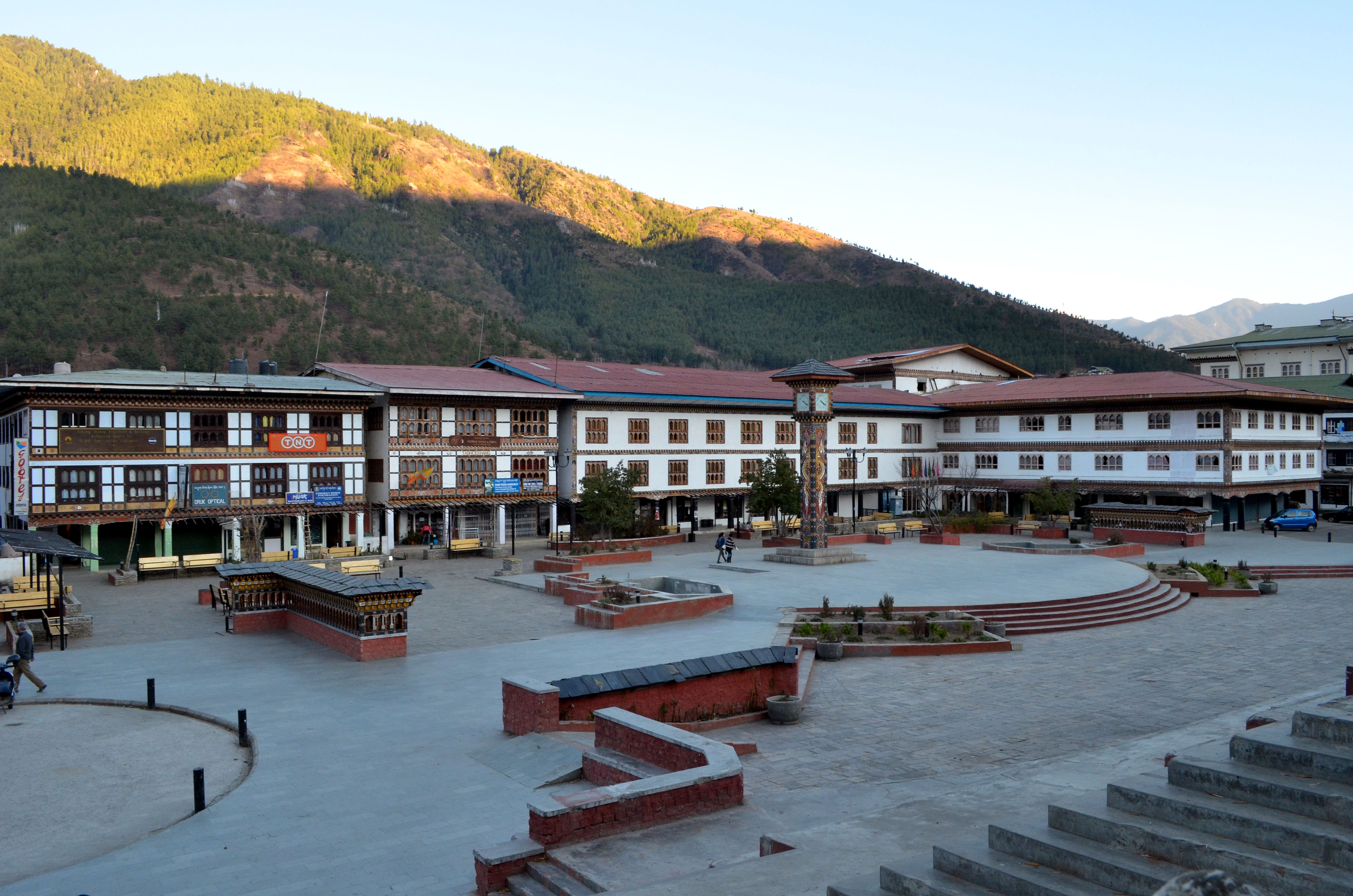
Clock Tower square, below Nordzin Lam, Thimphu.

The Clock Tower Square is a recently renovated square surrounded by shops and restaurants. Fountains and traditional Bhutanese Mani or prayer wheels make the place more comfortable. On one side, the luxurious Druk Hotel is situated. Various programmes and activities are held here. It was also the check point for the SAARC Car Rally.

Motithang Takin Preserve

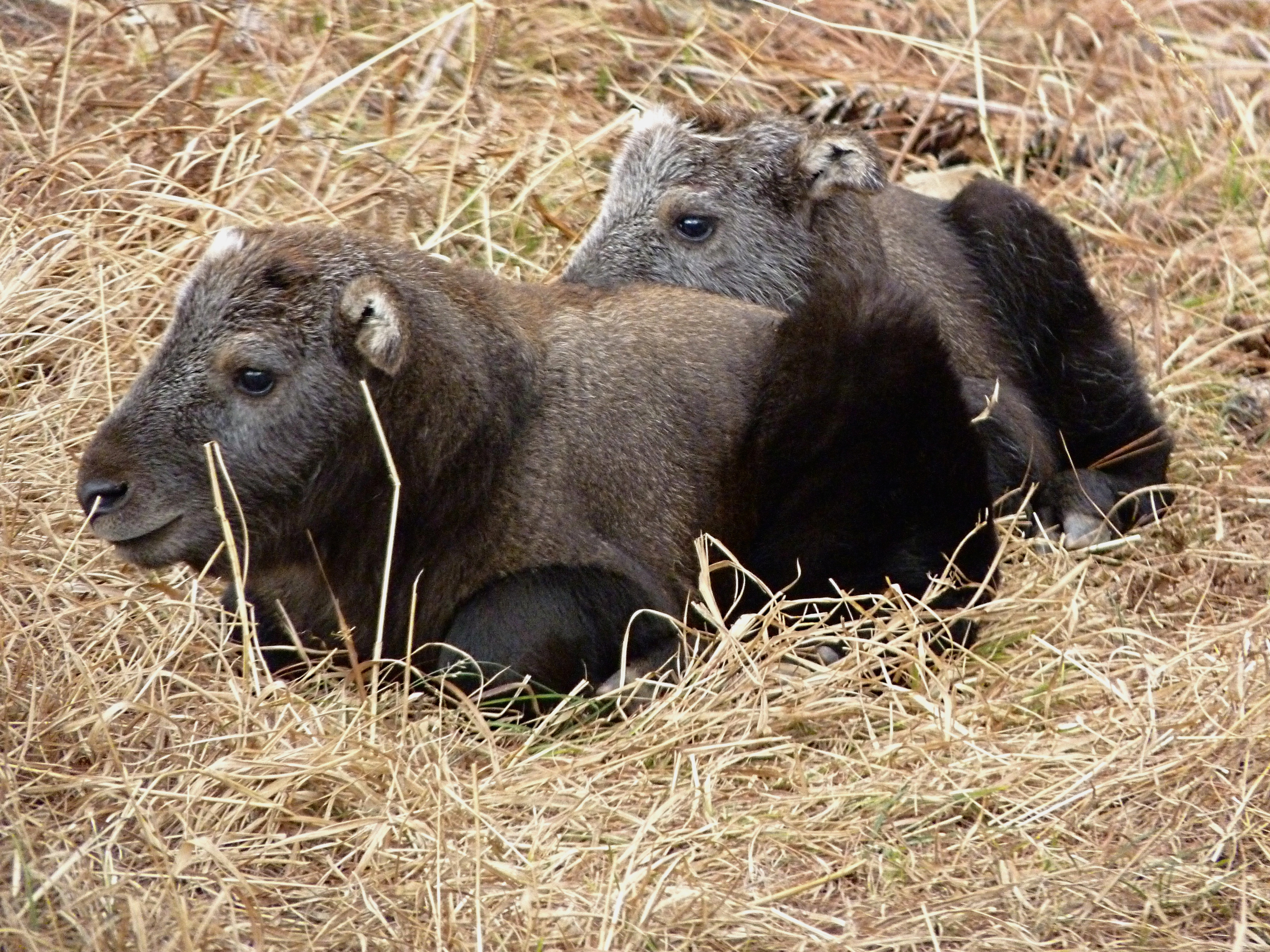
Motithang Takin Preserve.

The Motithang Takin Preserve in Thimphu is a wildlife reserve area for Bhutan takin, the national animal of Bhutan. Originally a mini-zoo, it was converted into a preserve when it was discovered that the animals refrained from inhabiting the surrounding forest even when set free. The reason for declaring the takin as a National Animal of Bhutan on 25 November 2005 (Budorcas taxicolor) is attributed to a legend of the animal's creation in Bhutan in the 15th century by Lama Drukpa Kunley. The King of Bhutan believed that it was improper for a Buddhist country to confine animals for religious and environmental reasons, so he ordered the closure of the mini-zoo and the release of the animals into the forest. However, the Takin remained rooted to the town and were seen straying in the streets of Thimphu in search of fodder. Hence, an exclusive preserve was created for them to live freely.

== Economy ==
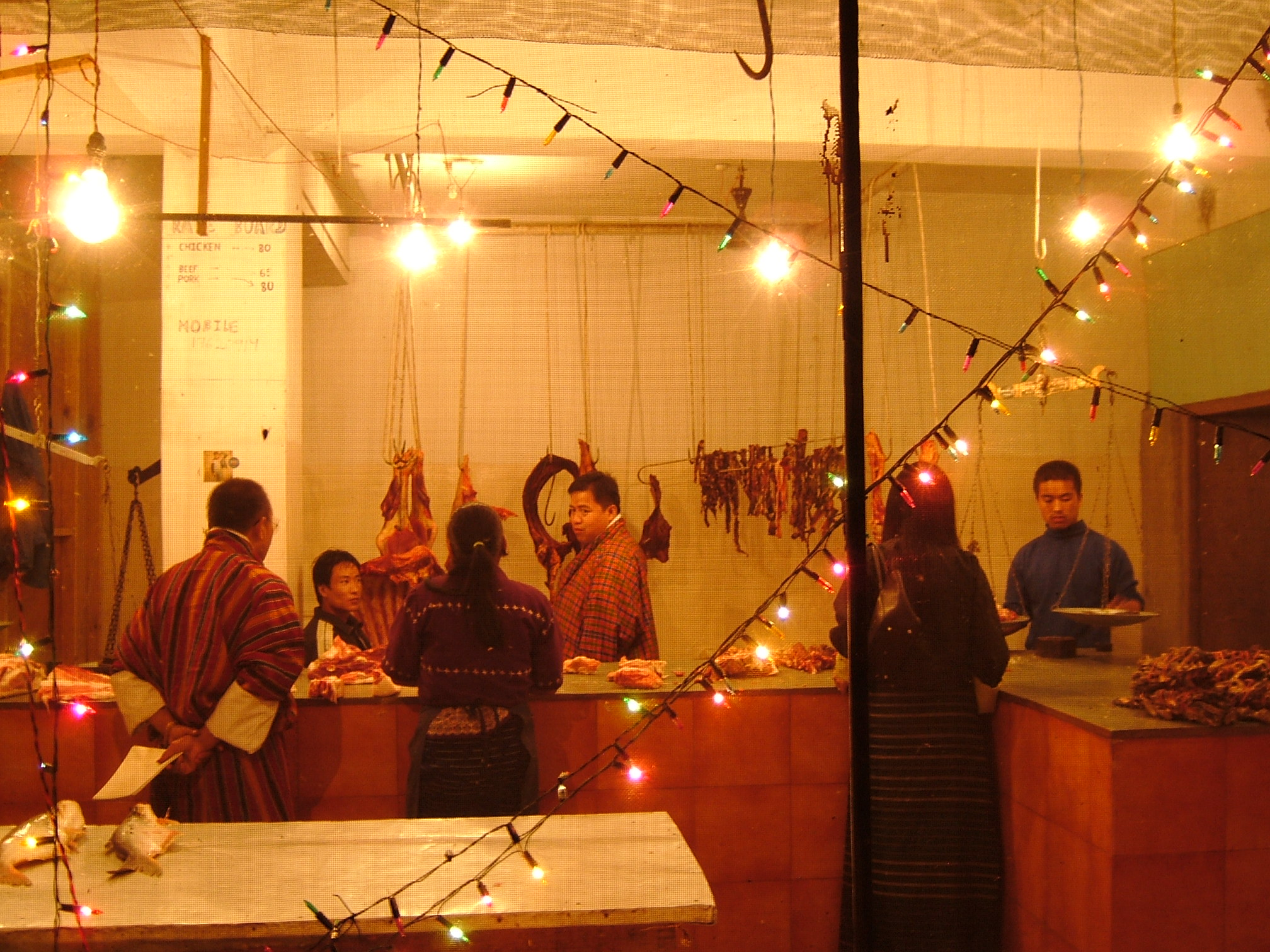
Inside a shop in Thimphu.

Thimphu is the political and economic centre of Bhutan and the location of the central government.

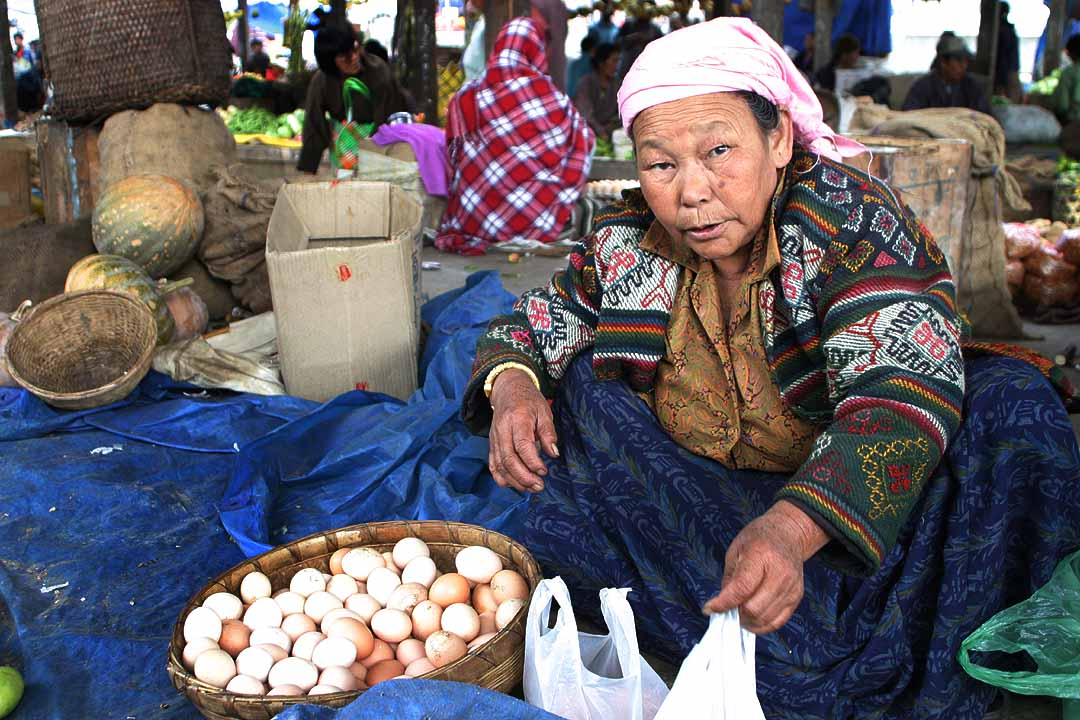
Local market in Thimphu.

A morning market is held on the central square during weekends. These are the only days when the residents of Thimphu can buy fresh fruit and vegetables. The inhabitants rely on the supermarkets for other provisions throughout the week. The market also sells yak butter, cheese, wooden bowls and fabrics. A number of cheap souvenirs from Nepal are also sold at the market. Behind the open market, several shops sell Chinese and Bangladeshi crockery, appliances, shoes, silks and carpets. For many years merchants would come to the central square from all over Bhutan and market their goods and would sleep in the open air. However, in 1986, platforms were erected and in 1989 covered market halls were built over the platforms. A special building for meat products was constructed on the north side of the market. In 2006, the handicrafts section was moved to the new stalls on the other side of the new bridge, built in the traditional style in 2005.

The Loden Foundation, Bhutan's first registered charity, has been based in Thimphu since 2007. It is run by a board of trustees composed of prominent citizens, and the foundation has a working team in the United Kingdom (UK). The organisation was established to support education and promote learning and entrepreneurship in Bhutan and other Himalayan areas and to promote Bhutanese culture and religion in other parts of the world.

=== Tourism ===
Bhutan was opened up for tourism in 1974. The government-owned Tourism Corporation was set up in Thimphu to support and organise tours to destinations of cultural importance in Bhutan, concentrating on Buddhism, weaving, birds, nature and trekking. This organization was privatised in 1994 as the Bhutan Tourism Development Corporation. The corporation also owns and manages hotels and tourist lodges at major tourist centres in Bhutan. It has its own fleet of cars and also interpreters in several international languages to cater to tourists from various countries.

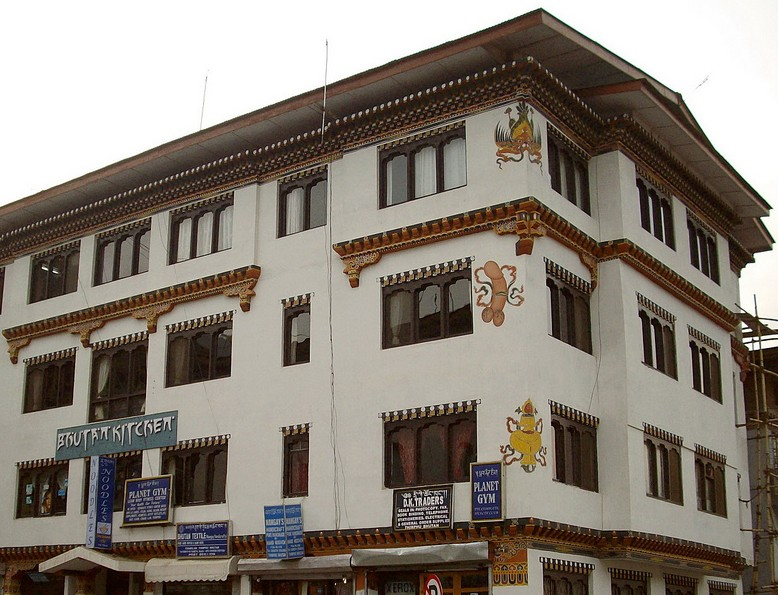
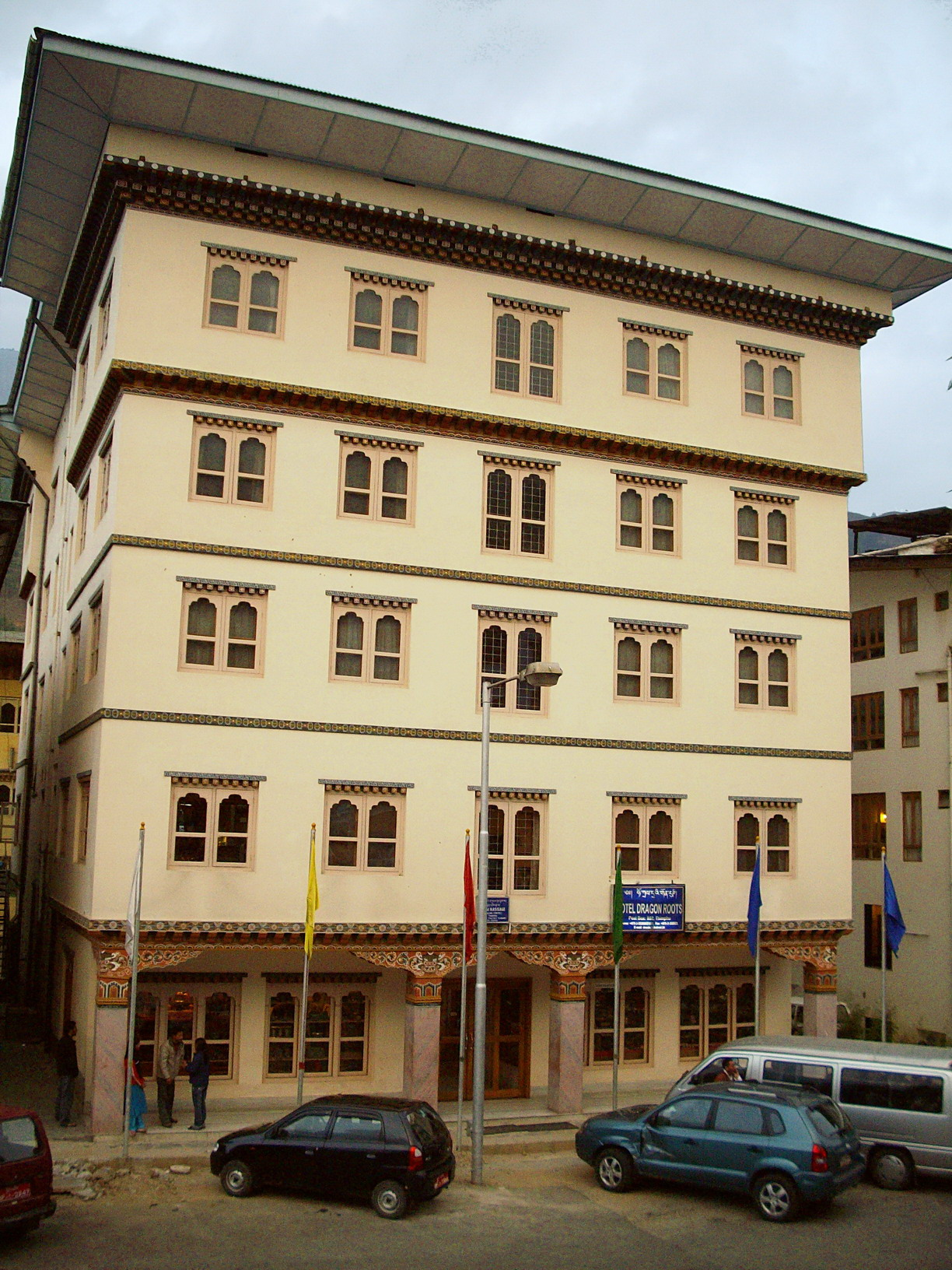
Left: Bhutan Kitchen. Right: Hotel Dragon Roots.

Thimphu is not known for its night life but the number of nightclubs and pool rooms is growing quickly.

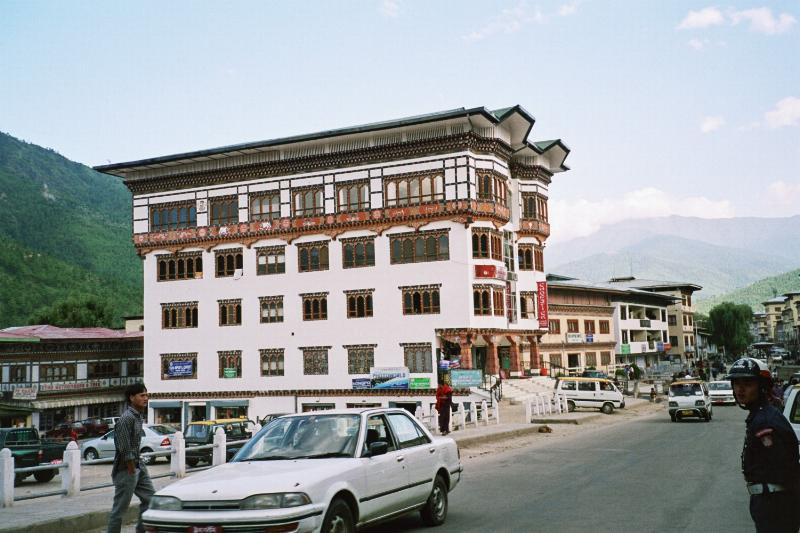
Streetlife in Thimphu

The main street, Norzim Lam, contains a number of shops, small hotels, and restaurants. The Bhutan Textile Museum, the National Library, the Chang Lam Plaza and the sports field are buildings of note around this street area. Near the main square is a clock, decorated with dragons, which is now an open-air theatre site and art and craft stores and the Tashi supermarket. In the building in front of the old cinema there is a Chinese restaurant and trekking stores.

The Drentoen Lam street is located off the main street and contains the post office, bank, administrative buildings, and several music stores. Doebum Lam road runs parallel to the main Norzim Lam and also contains the Chamber of Commerce, Department of Tourism and the Ministry of Trade buildings and the odd bakery. In 2006, a new shopping district opened between Doebum Lam and Norzim Lam which includes the Zangdopelri shopping complex, the Phuntsho Pelri Hotel and Seasons, an Italian restaurant.

== Government and civic administration ==
As the capital of Bhutan, most of the important political institutions in the country are based in Thimphu, including the embassies and the National Assembly of Bhutan. The National Assembly has 47 members, who were elected in the first ever general elections on March 24, 2008. Jigme Thinley's Druk Phuensum Tshogpa Party won a landslide victory, securing 45 seats. The People's Democratic Party won the other two, but its leader Sangay Ngedup lost the election in his constituency.

=== Civic administration ===
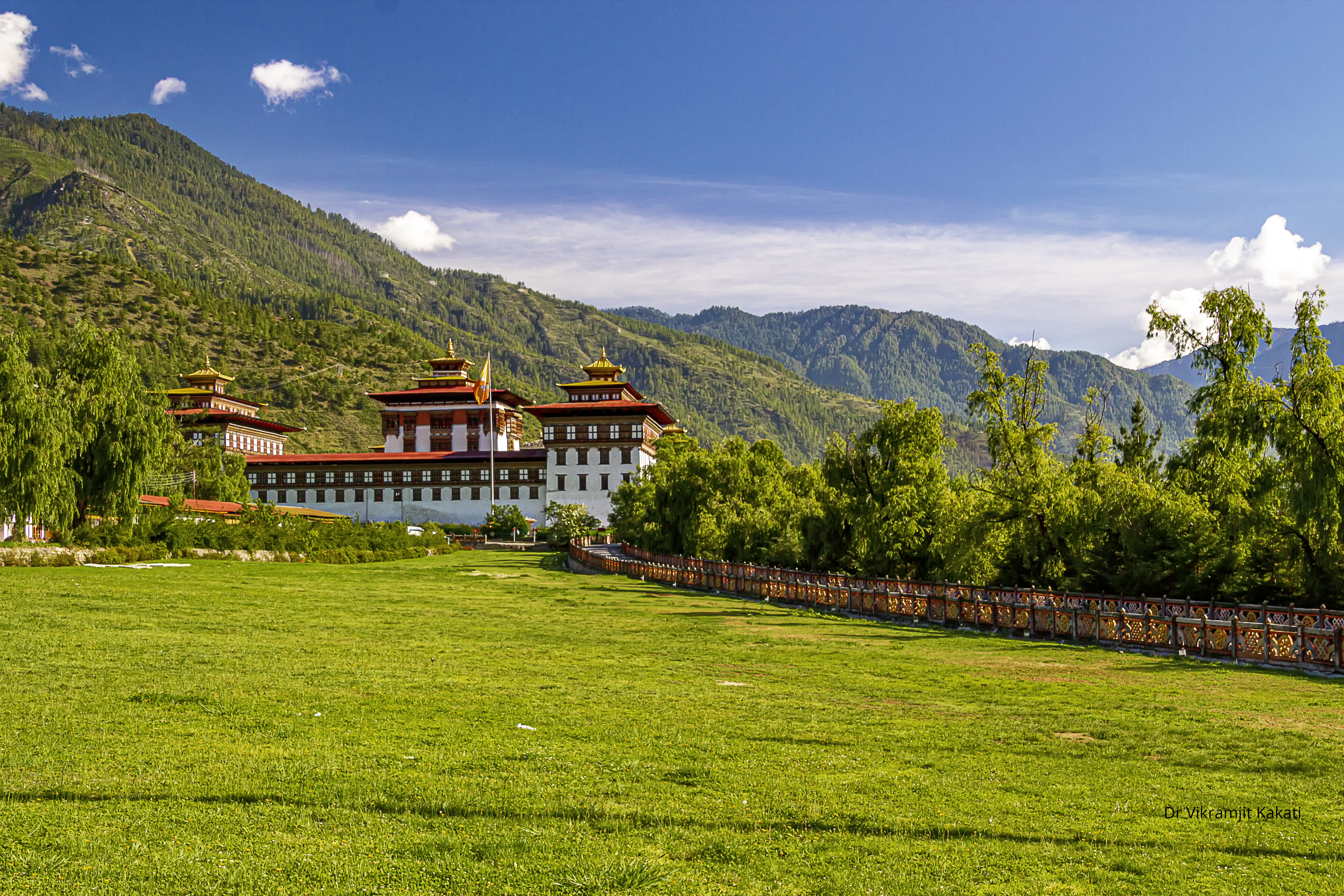
Dechencholing Palace, Thimphu, Bhutan

The Civic Administration of Thimphu city is the responsibility of the Thimphu Municipal Corporation (TMC). It was established in 1995 through a royal decree. It became an autonomous corporation in 1999, following the enactment of the Municipal Act of 1999. Its headquarters is at the Lungtenzampa zone of Thimphu. The corporation is headed by a mayor (Dasho Nima Wangdi) who is called Thrompon in the Bhutanese language. The mayor is appointed by the Ministry of Works and Human Settlement (MoWHS). An executive committee comprising 17 members governs the corporation; 8 members are elected from 6 zones and 7 members are nominated from government organizations and meet nearly every 6 weeks. However, its capacity to deal with the problems is hindered by lack of adequate staff (without any proportionate increase in staff strength to deal with its large jurisdiction) and its expenditure far outstrips the revenue earned. In order to provide cost effective services, the Corporation (as the regulating body) has contemplated privatization of public services, particularly water supply, solid waste, sewerage and parking.

=== Civic amenities ===
The Thimphu metropolitan area has all the basic amenities. Further additions and improvements have been planned and are under implementation, as part of the ‘Thimphu Structured Plan’. Water Supply, sanitation and health care have been fully addressed.

==== Water supply and sanitation ====
Service-oriented municipal corporations have been established in the two biggest urban centres in Bhutan, namely Thimphu and Phuentsholing. Thimphu Municipal Corporation (TMC) is the service organization that has the mandate for executing urban water supply and sanitation programmes in Thimphu city. TMC is an autonomous ‘Civic Body’ under the municipal charter granted in 2003, as per the Bhutan Municipal Act of 1999. However, the overall responsibility to formulate strategies and policies for human settlement in the country rests with the Ministry of Works and Human Settlement of the central government, as the nodal agency, with its subordinate Department of Urban Development and Engineering Services made responsible for executing urban water supply and sanitation programmes.

Access to potable water is available to 90% of the population in Thimphu, though water supply is intermittent, attributed to leakage and high consumer demand.

Conventional piped sewerage with lagoon treatment has been installed in the core areas of Thimphu with coverage of about 70%. However, the urban sanitation issues that have been flagged for action are: to ensure provision of flush toilets or latrines with proper septic tanks and soak pits in all new houses; dismantling VIP latrines and long drop toilets; to provide piped sewerage and wastewater treatment plants in all urban areas, allocation of funds for piped sewerage and treatment plant and awareness campaign on basic sanitation.

Thimphu also has an organised waste collection and disposal system. However, the quantum of waste generation in the city, which has about 6,982 households and 1,000 institutions, was projected to double in the period 2000–2010. At present, the solid waste disposal is at the sanitary landfill site, which may become inadequate soon. This problem is intended to be addressed by minimizing waste generation and adopting proper waste segregation methods.

== Law and order ==
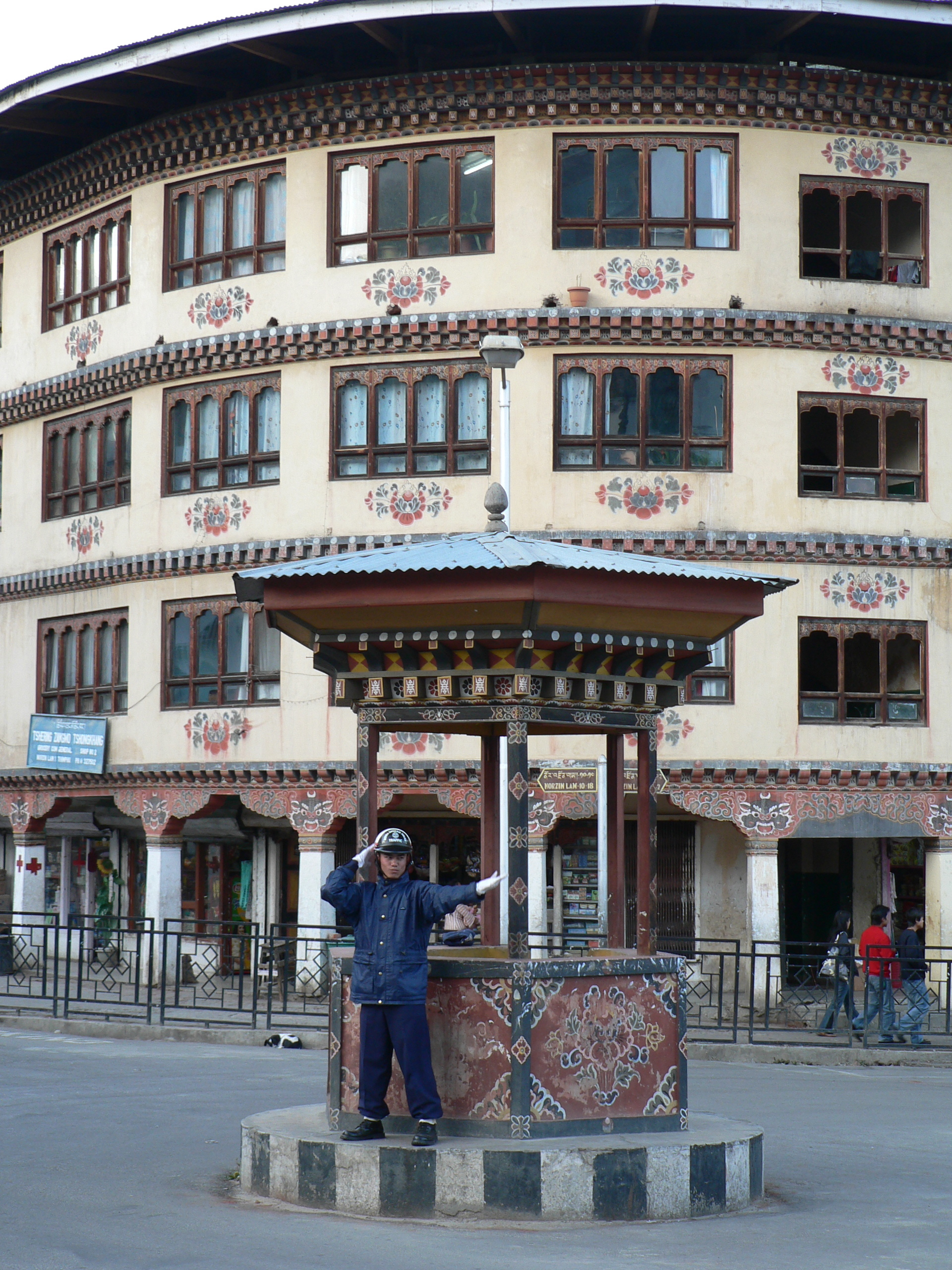
A traffic policeman at a circle on Thimphu road.

Law and order in Thimphu and in the country as a whole are the responsibility of the Royal Bhutan Police (RBP), a national police branch of the armed forces, established in Thimphu in September 1965 when 555 personnel were reassigned from the Royal Bhutan Army. The organization is responsible for law and order, traffic control, and crime prevention. In 1988, a fingerprint bureau was established in Thimphu, for which a female second lieutenant received specialized training. Bhutan became a member of Interpol on 19 September 2005; since then, Interpol has maintained a National Central Bureau at RBP headquarters in Thimphu.

The RBP is headed by a chief of police who is under the control of the Ministry of Home and Cultural Affairs. He is assisted by a deputy chief of police. The headquarters of the RBP is located in the capital city of Thimphu and is divided into three branches directly under the chief of police. The RBP has grouped districts into "ranges," which are under the administrative control of range police officers. A district police officer heads the police force in a district. There are a number of police stations, outposts, and checkpoints in a district; the highest-ranking officer is usually designated the officer in charge of that particular area. Thimphu district and the city fall under Range I. Recruits are trained at the police training centres in Zilnon, Namgyeling–Thimphu, Jigmeling–Gelephu, and Tashigatshel–Chukha.

== Health care ==
Basic health facilities are provided free of any charge to all citizens in Bhutan. There are no private practitioners operating any clinics anywhere in Thimphu or Bhutan. Every citizen is treated free of any charge including foreign tourists needing medical care. The health care centre established in Thimphu is the National Referral Hospital. 'Traditional Medicine' is also in vogue and the "Institute of Traditional Medicine" has been set up in Thimphu to promote this widely practiced herbal medical cure in rural areas of Bhutan.

National Referral Hospital

The National Referral Hospital (full name Jigme Dorji Wangchuck National Referral Hospital) in Thimphu was established in 1972 and is the main hospital in Bhutan. The National Referral Hospital provides free basic medical treatment as well as advanced surgeries and emergency services to citizens from all over the country. The hospital provides sophisticated health evaluation and management services in the country and has facilities of CT and MRI diagnosis equipment and improved lab services. The hospital has a library with many textbooks. The hospital is one of five medical service centres within Thimphu. The others are: two Indian hospitals (DANTAK hospital at Semtokha and IMTRAT hospital in the main town), the BHU in Dechencholing and the Outreach Clinic in Motithang.

Institute of Traditional Medicine

The Institute of Traditional Medicine was set up in 1979 with assistance from World Health Organization (WHO) to develop and popularise Bhutanese herbal medicine, which has been used by the rural people in Bhutan for many centuries. The institute is located on a hill promontory above the Thimpu town. It is a semi-wooden structure built colourfully like a "Manor House". Traditionally, Bhutanese medicine has been influenced by traditional Tibetan medicine and also some aspects of Indian medicine, particularly the "Three Humors of bile, wind and phlegm" that "dictates the state of our physical and spiritual health." The institute is staffed by scientists who claim that they have now developed a "mixture of five herbs that could possess spermogenitic powers" (a kind of a herbal viagra), which is under testing before development and marketing on a commercial basis. The main herb used is stated to be Cordyceps sinensis (caterpillar fungus), whose productive buds are available in the hills of Bhutan.

=== Lama Shenphen Zangpo ===
Lama Shenphen is a monk, author and social worker in Thimphu, who has worked with troubled youth since 1998. He was born in Swansea, United Kingdom, but spent more than 28 years practicing and studying Buddhism in Taiwan and Japan. He also teaches meditation and organizes drug outreach programs from the popular Ambient Cafe, on Norzin Lam, the main street of Thimphu.

In 2015, lama Shephen was awarded the National order of merit, Gold, by His Majesty the King in recognition for his contribution in mentoring Bhutanese youth.

== Culture ==
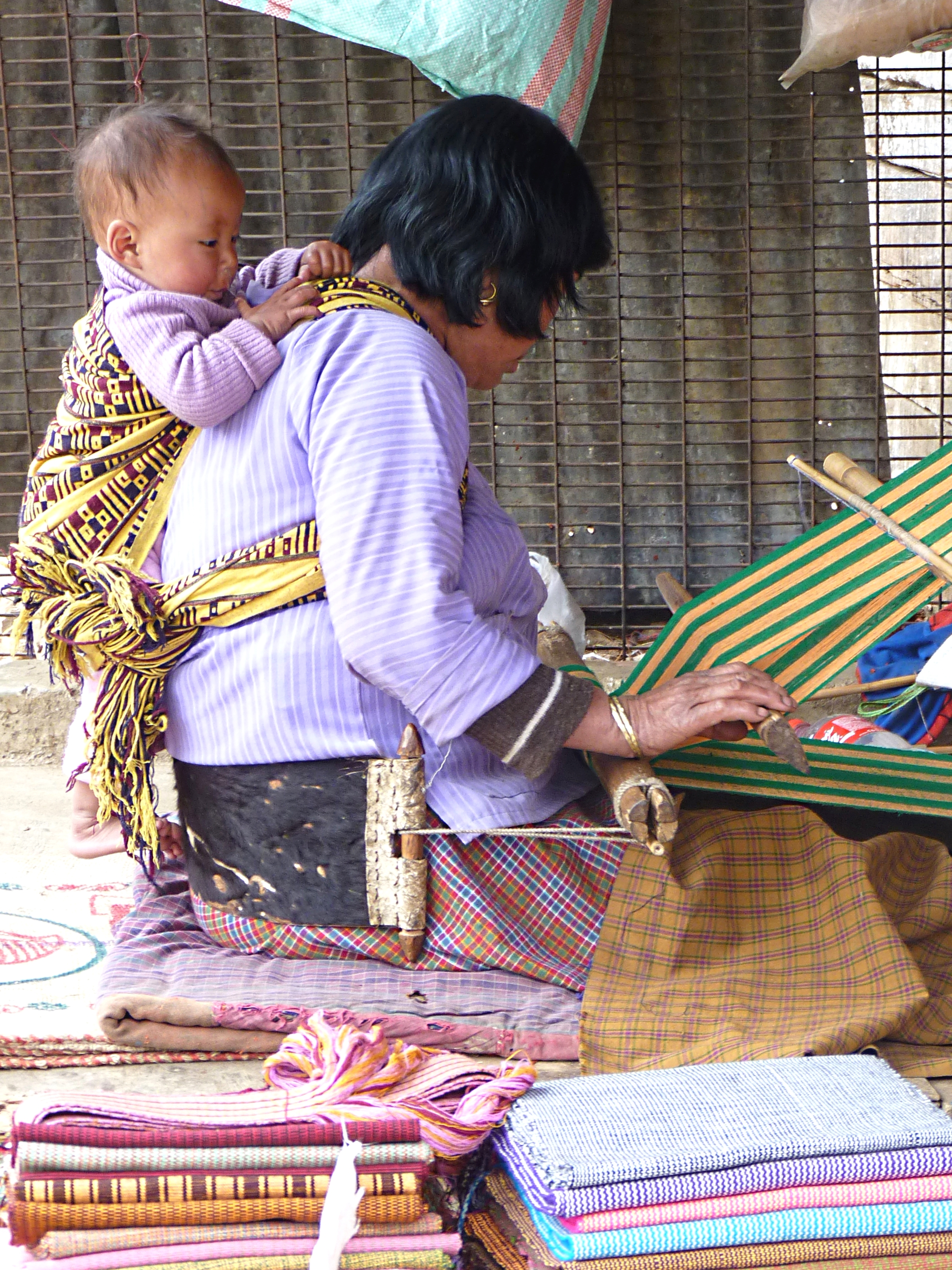
Weaving – particular heritage of women in Bhutan.

The culture of Bhutan is fully reflected in the capital city with respect to literature, religion, customs, and national dress code, the monastic practices, music, dance and in the media. Modernity has been blended without sacrificing on the traditional Buddhist ethos.

Literature

Ancient literature of Bhutan is preserved in the National Library. The script used in Bhutanese literature is in the Bhutanese script (though evolved from Tibetan script) known as jo yig developed in the 16th century. The printing process of these books on handmade paper and its binding are display items at the National Library. Modern literature is still evolving and a religious biography of women titled delog is a popular religious work. There are many writers who write in English now, mostly short stories and collection of folk tales of Bhutan; a popular author is Kunzang Choeden.

Royal Academy of Performing Arts

The Royal Academy of Performing Arts (RAPA), located in Thimphu, was established at the initiative of the late King Jigme Dorji Wangchuck in 1954, with the basic objective of preserving and promoting performing arts traditions of Bhutan. In 1967, it was institutionalised as an academy and the Royal Dance troupe was its creation. The institution provides training in national dance forms of Bhutan such as mask dances and also preserves the folk dance heritage. The professional dancers of the academy hold performances during the annual Thimphu Tsechu dance festival that is held in the premises of the Tashichhoe Dzong. Performances lasting for one hour are also arranged on specially requested occasions. The present activities at the academy are being reorganised with further expansion of its programs, including curriculum development for teaching.

National Library

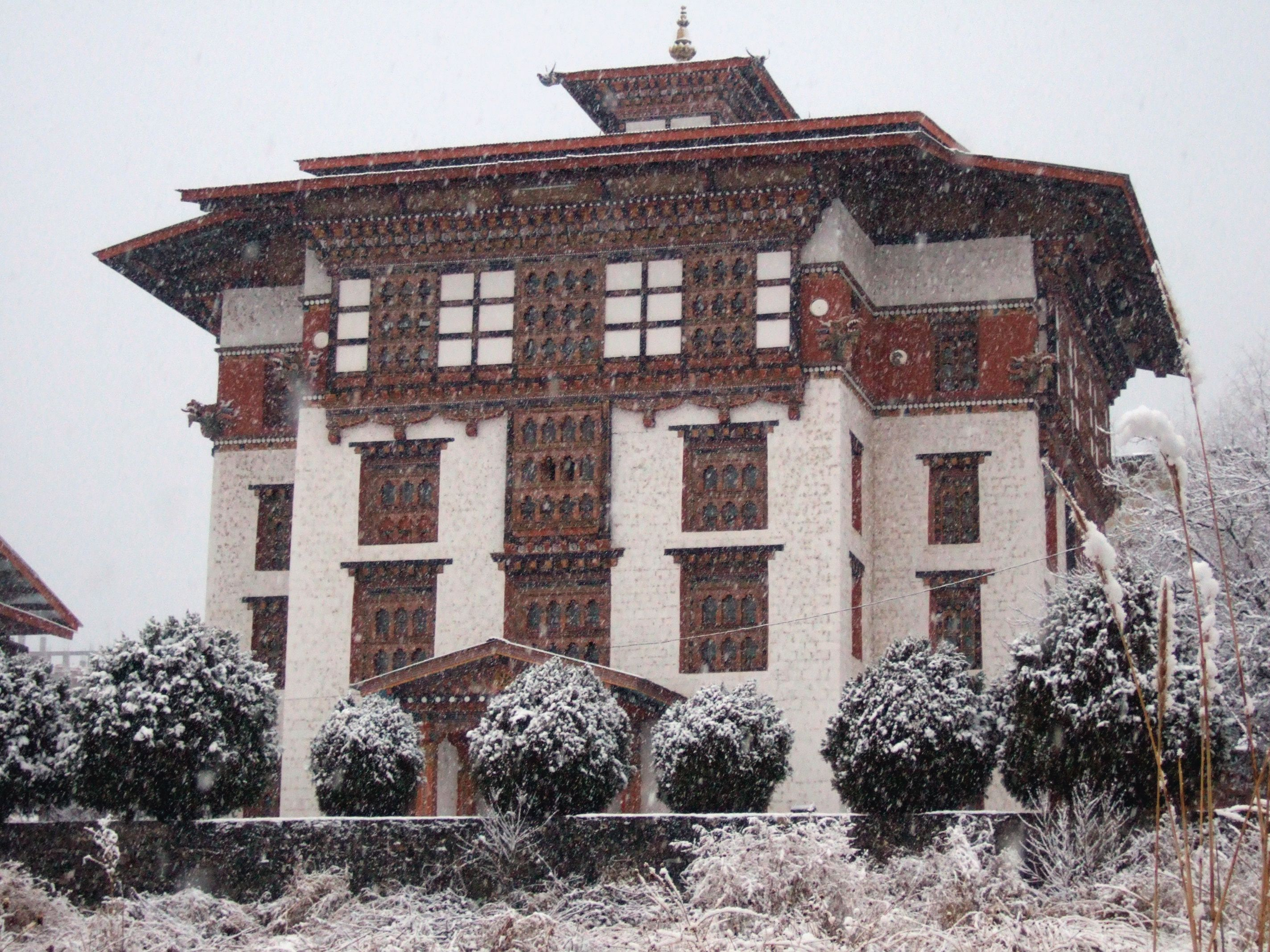
The National Library of Bhutan, Thimphu.

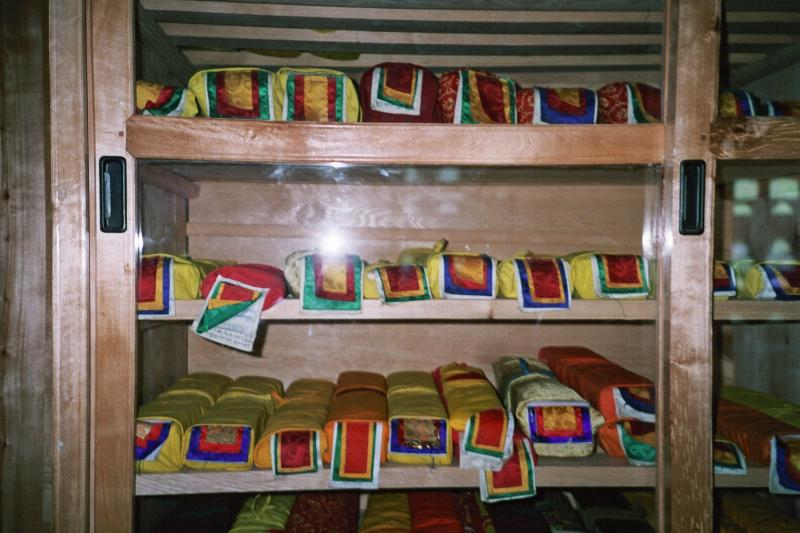
Interior of the National Library.

Established in 1967 and built in the style of a traditional temple, the National Library houses many ancient Dzonghka and Tibetan texts. It has been planned as "a major scriptural repository and research facility dedicated to the preservation and promotion of the rich literary, cultural and religious heritage" of Bhutan. The building is lavishly decorated and is said to represent vibrant Bhutanese architecture. On the ground floor of this building, there is a book reported to be the heaviest in the world, weighing 59 kilograms (130 lb), known as "Bhutan:a Visual Odyssey Across the Last Himalayan Kingdom". Traditional books and historic manuscripts written in Tibetan style on handmade paper bound between wooden flats and tied together are also preserved here. The library also houses an old printing press that was used for prayer flags. The library is also circumambulated by devotees as a mark of worship by the devout as it enshrines holy books and images of Bhutan's famous people such as the Zhabdrung, Namgyal, Pema Linga and Guru Rinpoche. Also on display here are a model of the Punakha Dzong and the Chorten architecture.

Music

The music of Bhutan has traditional genres such as zhungdra and boedra. The influence of Drukpa Buddhism and Buddhist music on Bhutanese culture is important. Many folk songs and chanting styles are derived from Drukpa music. In the 17th century, during the reign of Zhabdrung Ngawang Namgyal (1594–1652) great blossoming of folk music and dance (cham) took place. Instruments dating to this time include the lingm (flute), dramnyen (lute) and chiwang(fiddle). Ynagchen is an instrument made from hollow wood with 72 strings that are "struck with two bamboo sticks." Rigsar music has become popular in Thimphu and Bhutan and is performed on electric piano and synthesiser. It is, however, a fusion of traditional Bhutanese and Tibetan tunes and is also influenced by Hindi music. The music albums are produced by many popular Bhutanese male and female singers not only in Rigsar music but also in traditional folk songs and religious songs. Four music CDs of religious folk music, called the 'Tibetan Buddhist Rites' released by the monasteries with a recording sung by a manip (a traveling ascetic) that reminisces the arrival of Zhabdrung Ngawang Namgyal in Bhutan in the 17th century is popular.

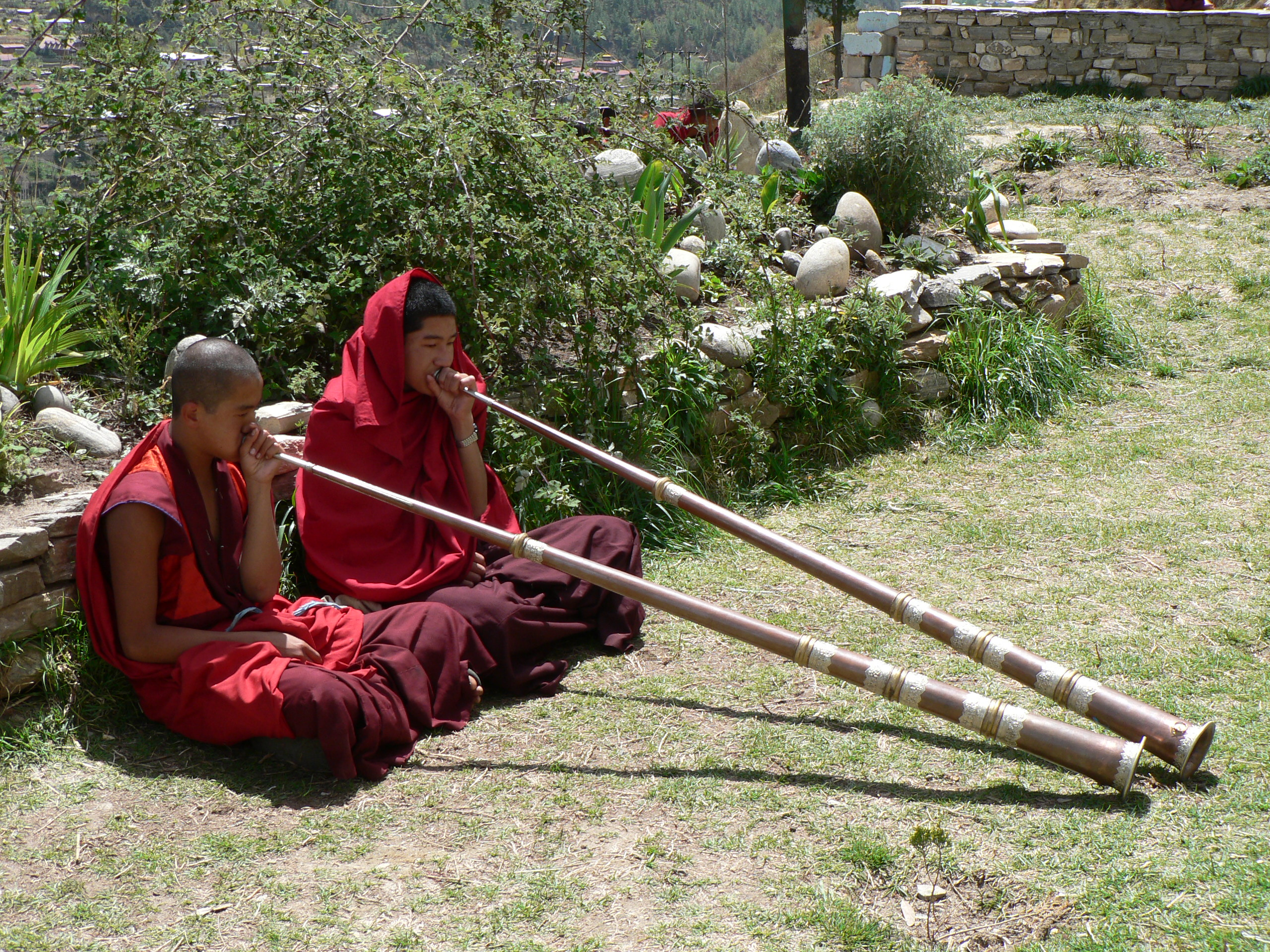
Monks at Dechen Phodrang.

To promote music in Bhutan, two music schools have been established in Thimphu, namely the Kilu Music School and the more recent Himalayan School of Music. The Kilu Music School, established in March 2005, is the first of its kind in Thimpu where students are taught the essentials of music such as: to practice their music reading and writing skills, and to improve their listening skills.

Kheng Sonam Dorji, of Kaktong village of Zhemgang District, is a renowned and committed musician, vocalist, and composer who resides in Thimphu. He plays several instruments native to Bhutan and India. He learnt drangyen under the elders of Bhutanese folk tradition. His contributions to Bhutanese culture include a string of hit Rigsar (Bhutanese pop) albums and the sound tracks of the popular Bhutanese film, "Travellers and Magicians (2004)". He also participated at the Smithsonian's Festival of American Folklife (2008).

Cinema

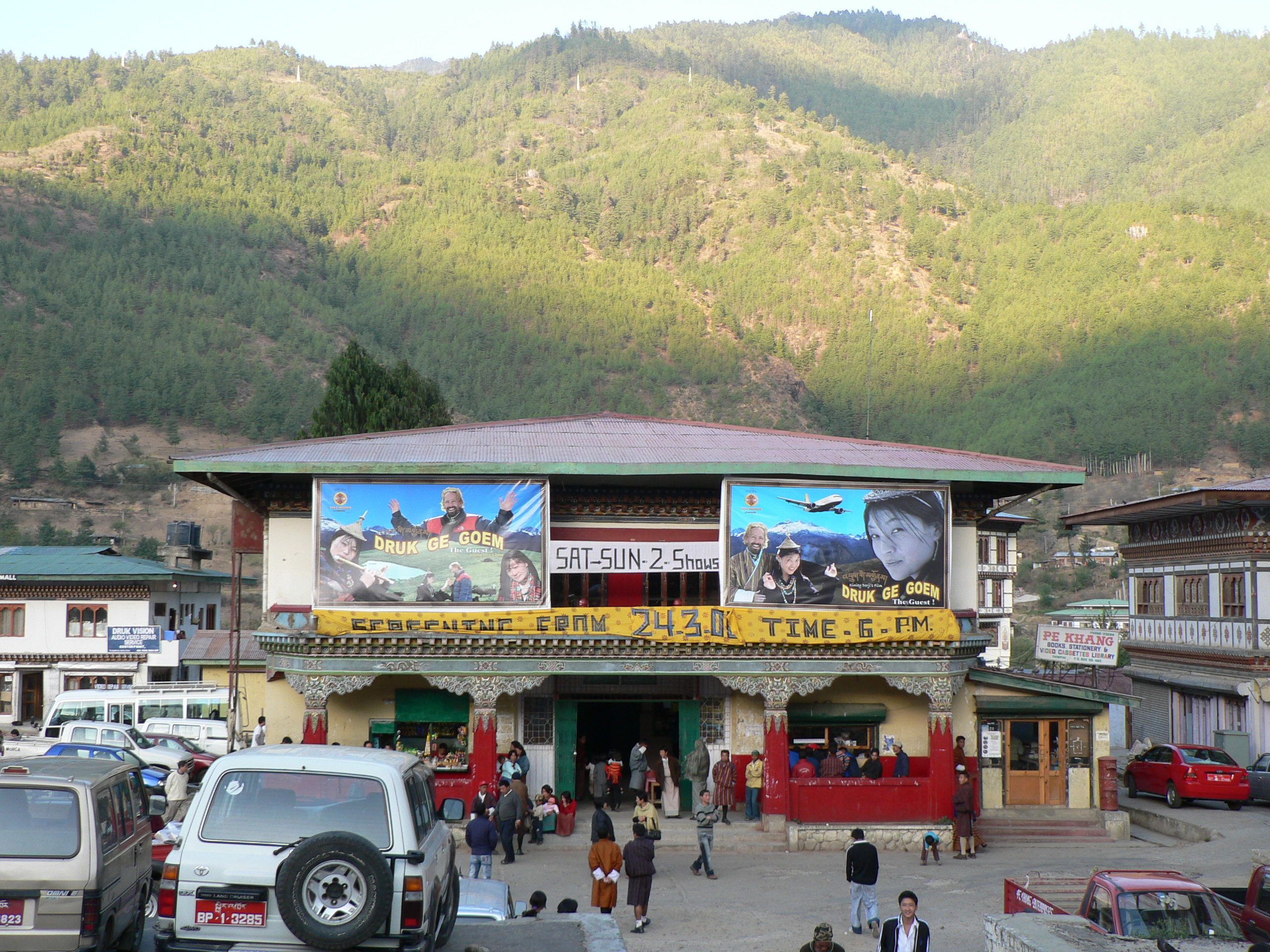
Cinema Hall in Thimphu.

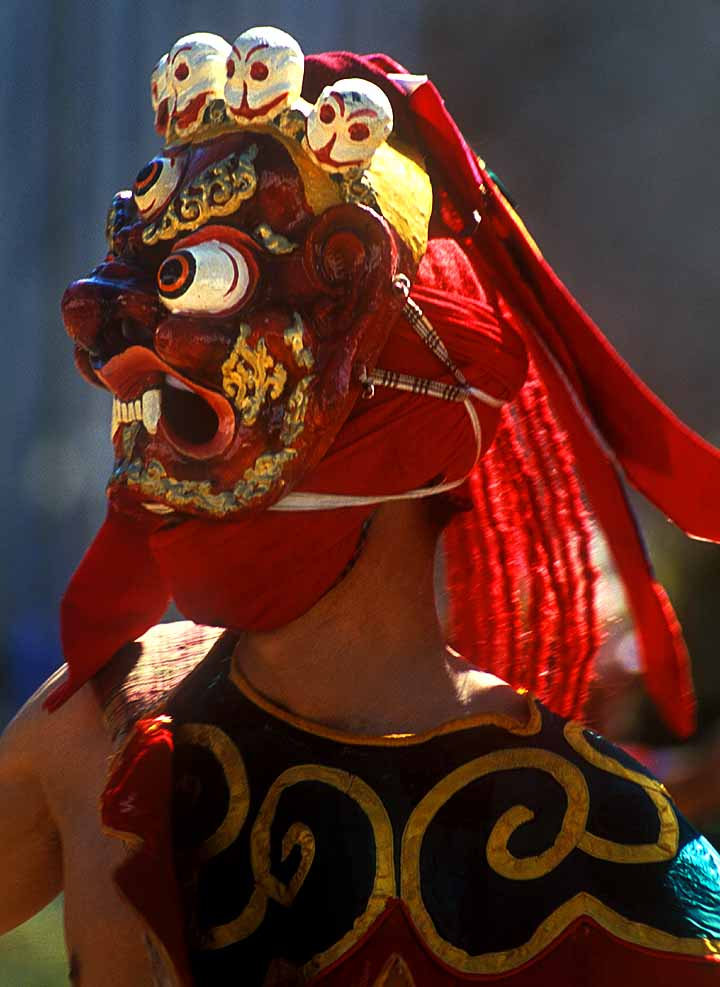
Chaam, sacred masked dances, are annually performed during Tsechu religious festivals held in monasteries.

Films made in Bhutan are very few. Quality of films produced is in a stage of improvement. National Film awards are presented in functions held in Thimphu to encourage Bhutanese film making. The only cinema hall in Thimphu, the Luger Cinema Hall, screens Bhutanese and Hindi movies; occasionally English/foreign-language movies are also screened here.

Thimphu Tsechu Festival

Mask dances, popularly known as Cham dances, are performed in the courtyards of the Tashichhoe Dzong in Thimphu during the four-day Tsechu festival, held every year during Autumn (September/October) on dates corresponding to the Bhutanese calendar. Tsechu means "tenth", so the festival is held on the 10th day of Bhutanese month. It is a religious folk dance form of Drukpa Buddhism, which was established in 1670. Tsechus are a series of dances performed by monks and also trained dance troupes to honour the deeds of Padmasambahva alias Guru Rinpoche. They are also social events when people turn up in their best attire, with women particularly bejeweled, and large numbers witness the ritual dances and also absorb the religious teachings on Buddhism. It is performed in each district in Bhutan at different periods; the Thimphu Tsechu and the Paro Tsechu are the most popular. The Thimphu Tsechu, held for four days is usually attended by the royal family and the Chief Abbot of Bhutan and other government officials. The opening day and concluding days are important and each day has a set programme. These colourfully costumed, masked dances (performed mostly by monks) typically are moral vignettes, or based on incidents from the life of the 9th century Nyingmapa teacher Padmasambhava and other saints.

Nightlife

A nightlife has begun to develop in Thimphu. Nightclubs have begun to spring up in the city. Thimphu's nightclubs have a reputation for high-quality ambience, entertainment, food, and music, and have hosted prominent Western celebrities.

=== Arts and crafts ===
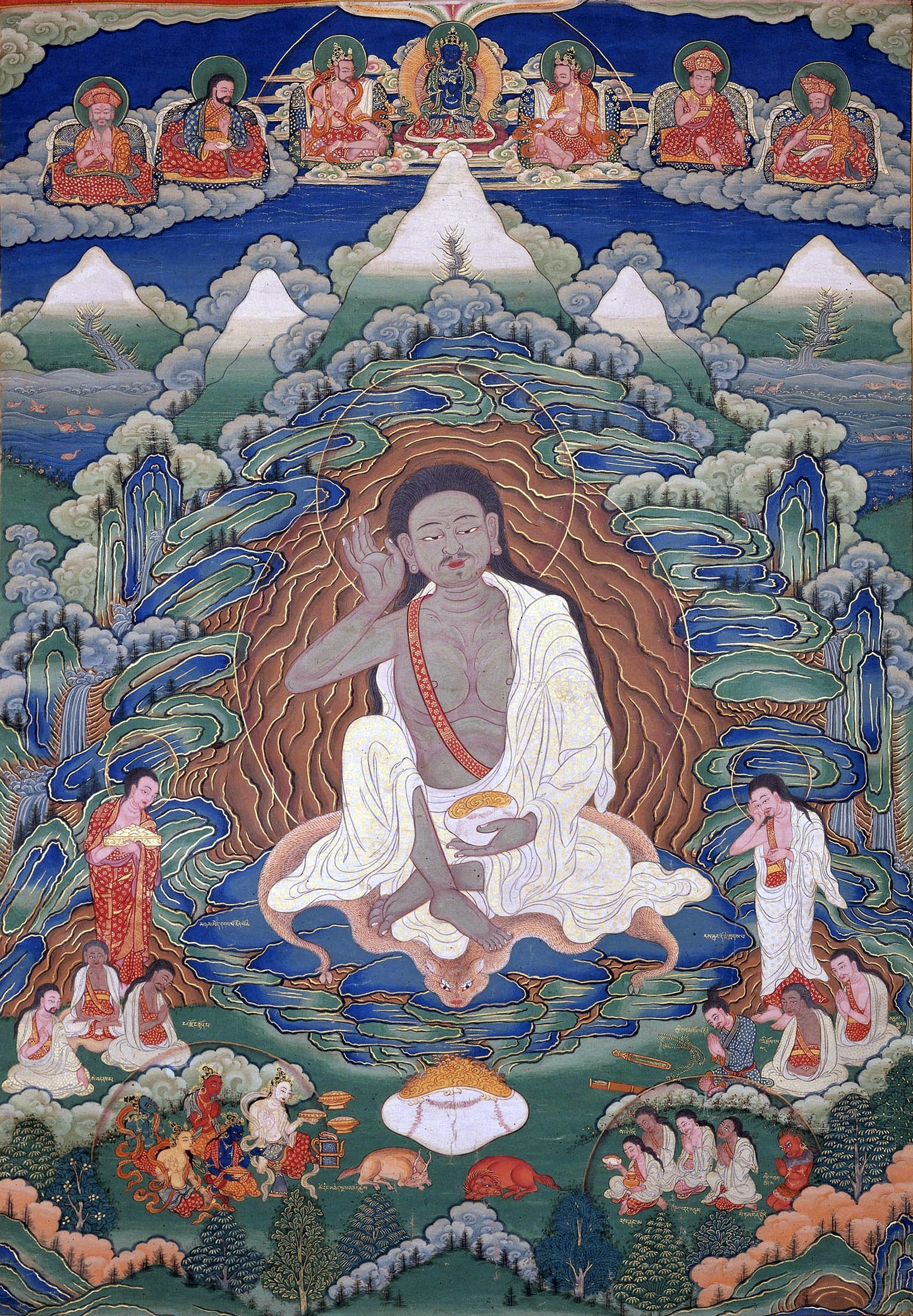
Thangka painting of Milarepa in a monastery in Thimphu.

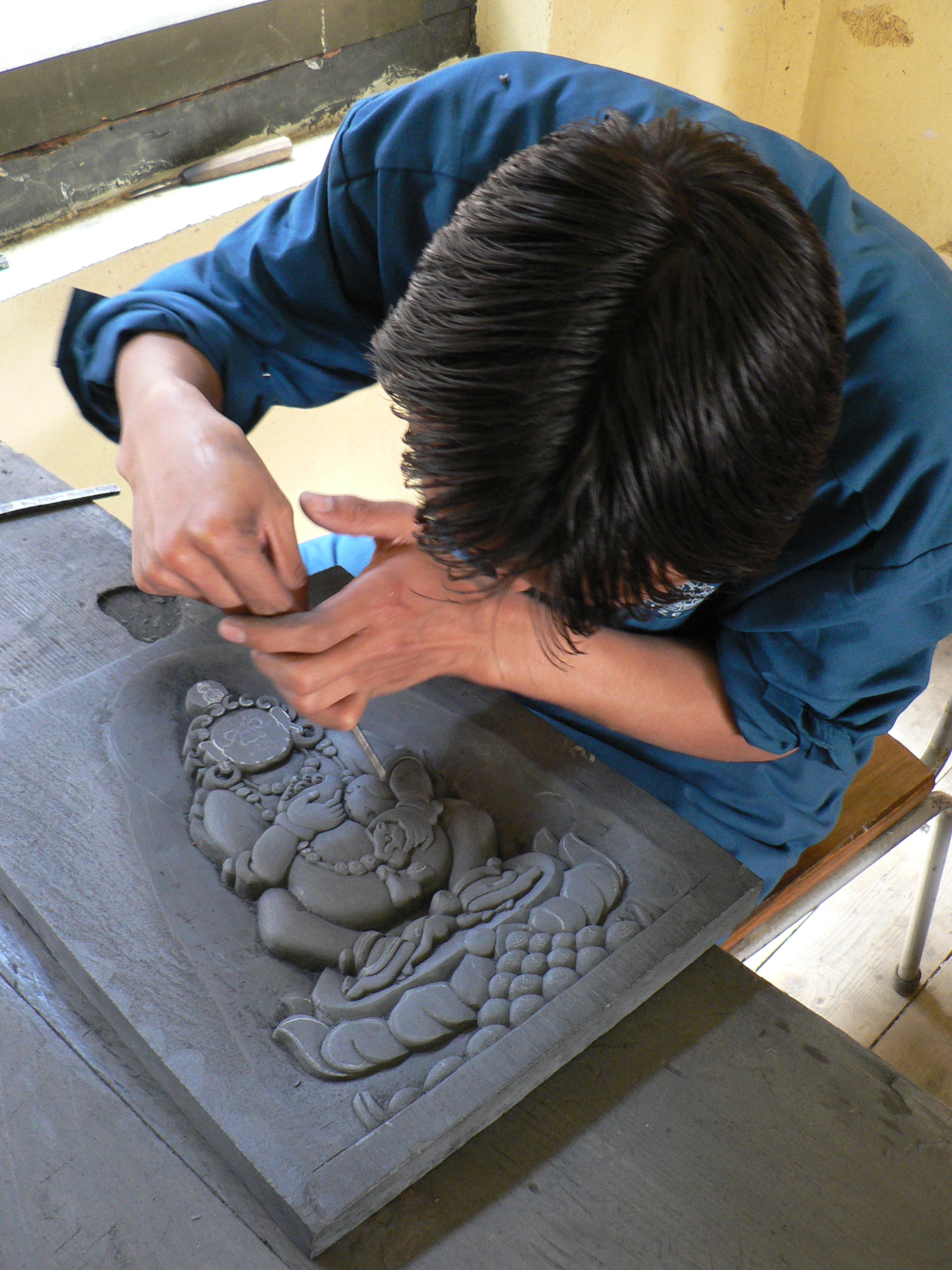
Slate carving, School of Traditional Arts.

The arts and crafts of Bhutan that represents the exclusive "spirit and identity of the Himalayan kingdom’ is defined as the art of Zorig Chosum, which means the "thirteen arts and crafts of Bhutan". The arts and crafts produced in Thimphu and other places in Bhutan include textiles, paintings, sculptures, paper making, wood carving, sword making and blacksmithing, boot making, bamboo craft, bow and arrow making and jewelry.

National Institute of Zorig Chusum

The National Institute of Zorig Chusum is the centre for Bhutanese art education. It was set up by the Government of Bhutan with the sole objective of preserving the rich culture and tradition of Bhutan and training students in all traditional art forms. Painting is the main theme of the institute, which provides 4–6 years of training in Bhutanese traditional art forms. The curricula cover a comprehensive course of drawing, painting, wood carving, embroidery, and carving of statues. Images of Buddha are a popular painting done here.

Handicrafts emporiums

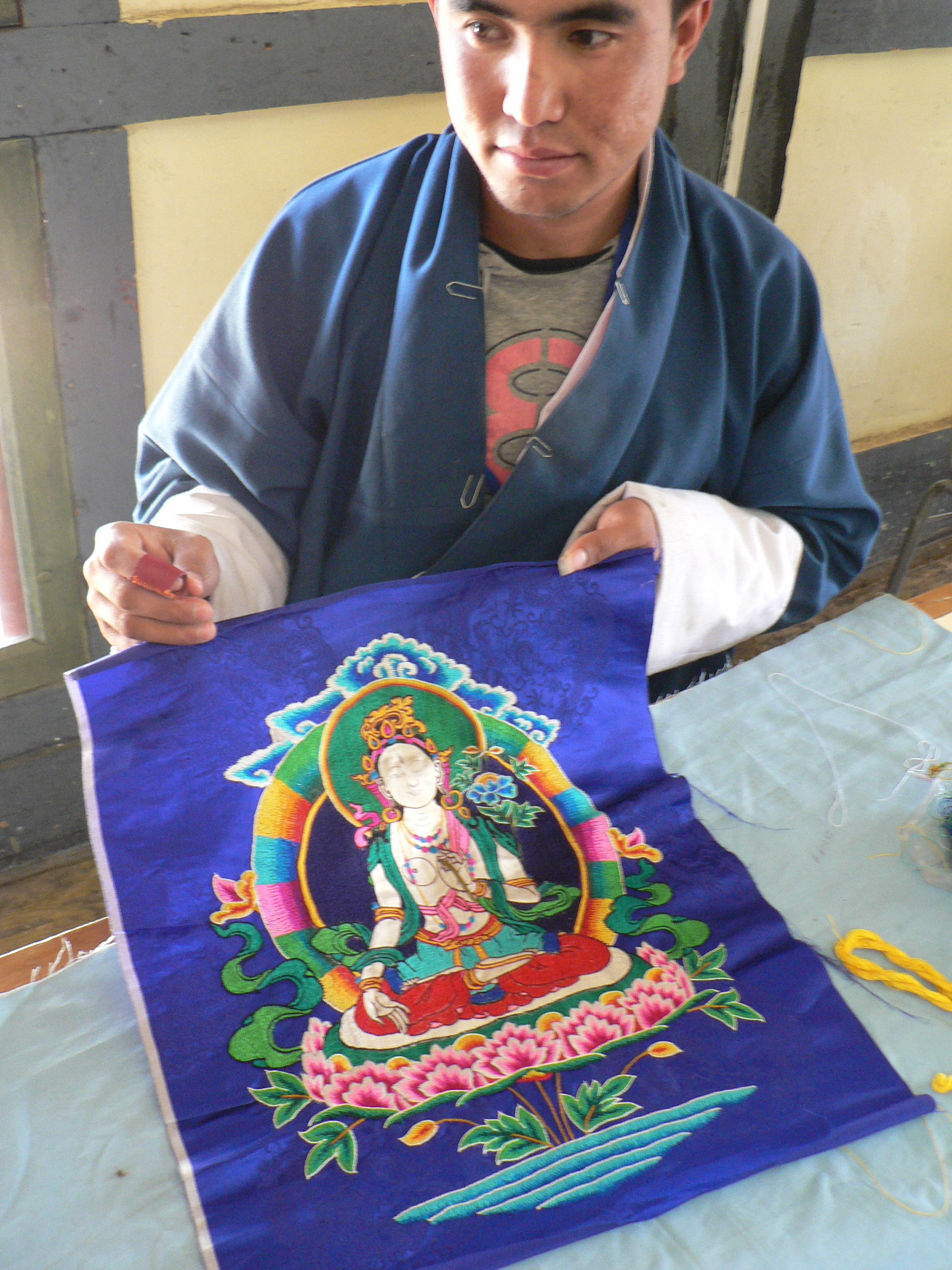
Embroidery, School of Traditional Arts.

There is a large government-run emporium close to the National Institute of Zorig Chusum, which deals with exquisite handicrafts, traditional arts, and jewelry; Gho and Kira, the national dress of Bhutanese men and women, are available in this emporium. The town has many other privately owned emporiums which deal with thangkas, paintings, masks, brassware, antique jewellery, painted lama tables known as choektse, drums, Tibetan violins and so forth. Zangma Handicrafts Emporium, in particular, sells handicrafts made in the Institute of Zorig Chusum.

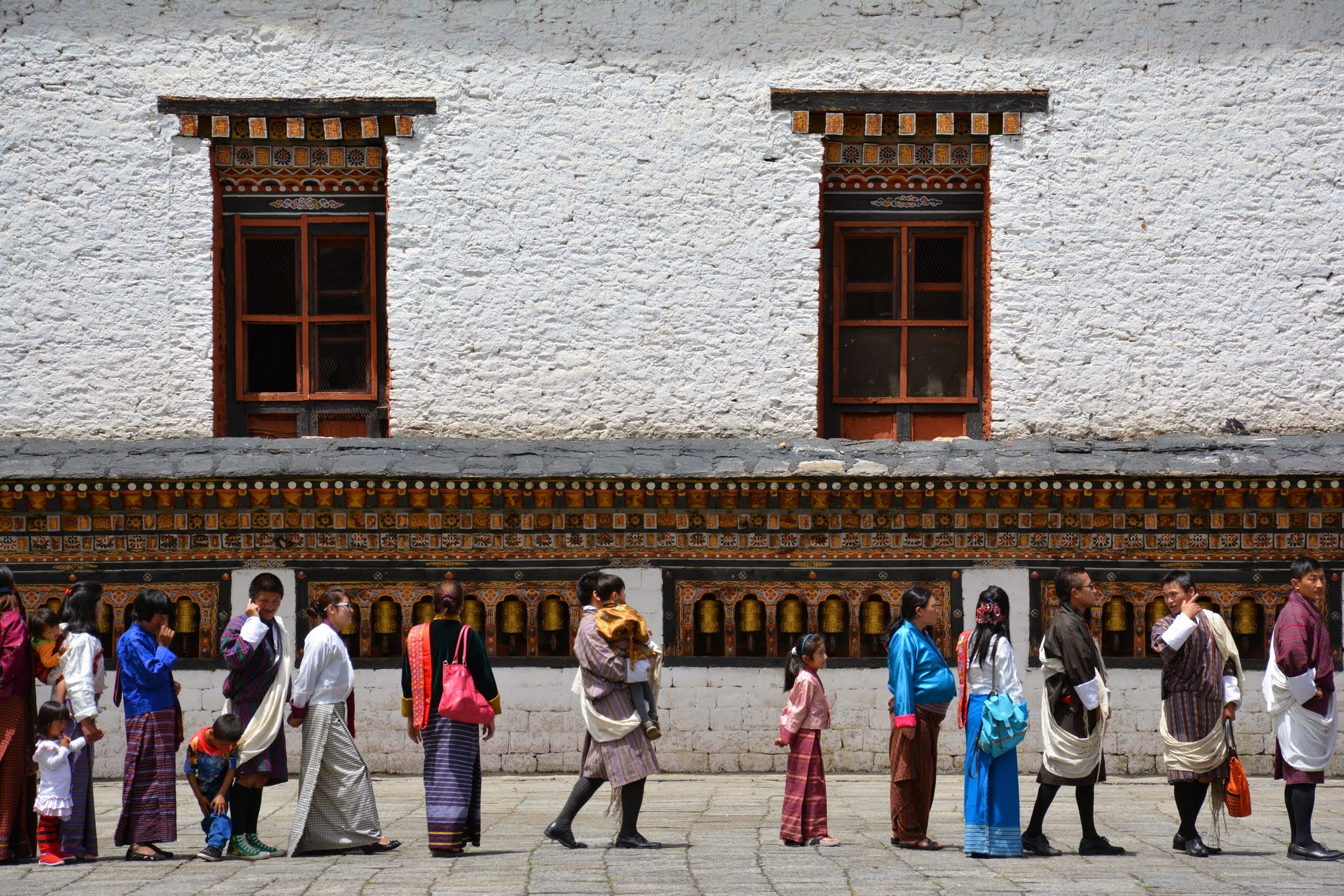
National clothes (in Thimphu)

Folk Heritage Museum

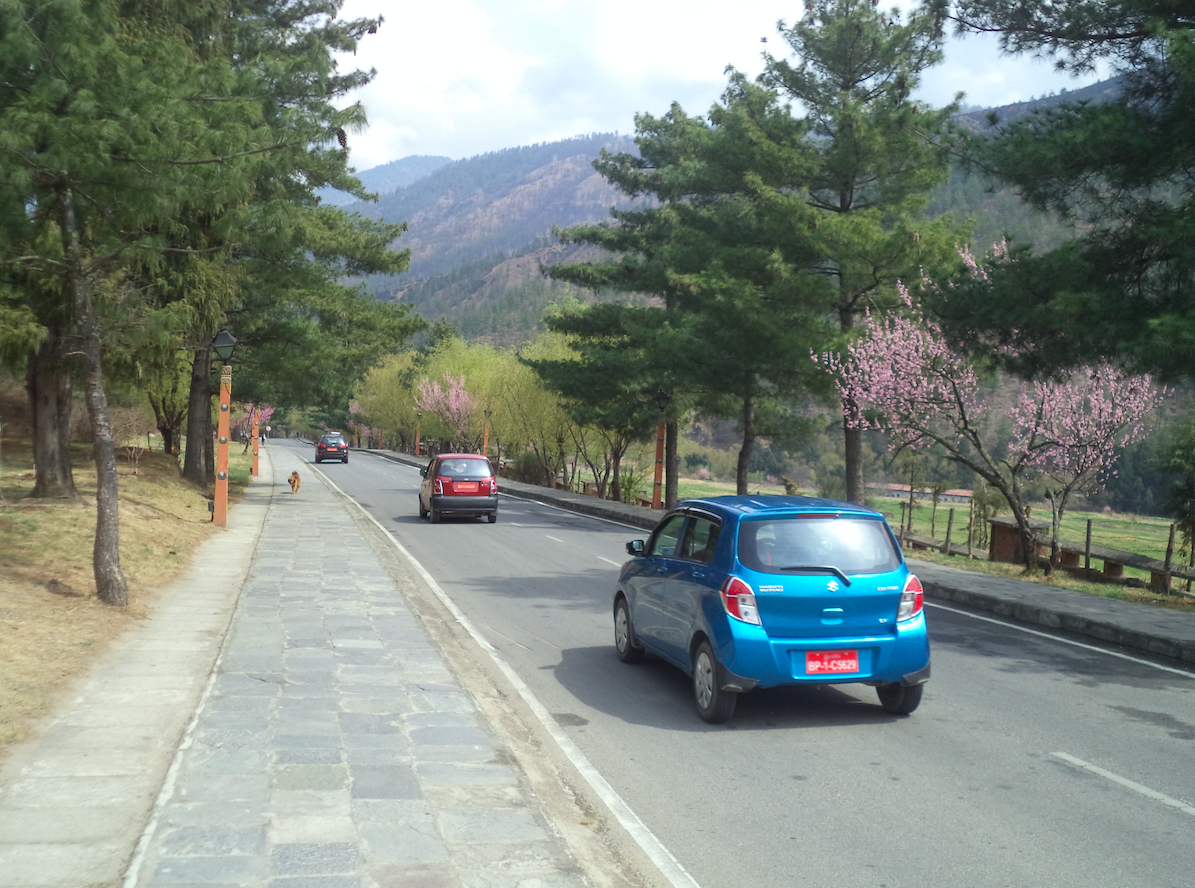
Road leading to a nearby town is at a walking distance from the National Folk Heritage Museum

Folk Heritage Museum in Kawajangsa, Thimphu is built on the lines of a traditional Bhutanese farm house with more than 100-year-old vintage furniture. It is built as a three storied structure with rammed mud walls and wooden doors, windows and roof covered with slates. It reveals much about Bhutanese rural life.

Voluntary Artists Studio

The Voluntary Artist Studio's objective is to encourage traditional and contemporary art forms among the youth of Thimphu who are keen to imbibe these art forms. The works of these young artists are also available on sale in the 'Art Shop Gallery' of the studio.

National Textile Museum

The National Textile Museum in Thimphu displays various Bhutanese textiles that are extensive and rich in traditional culture. It also exhibits colourful and rare kiras and ghos (traditional Bhutanese dress, kira for women and gho for men).

== Religion ==
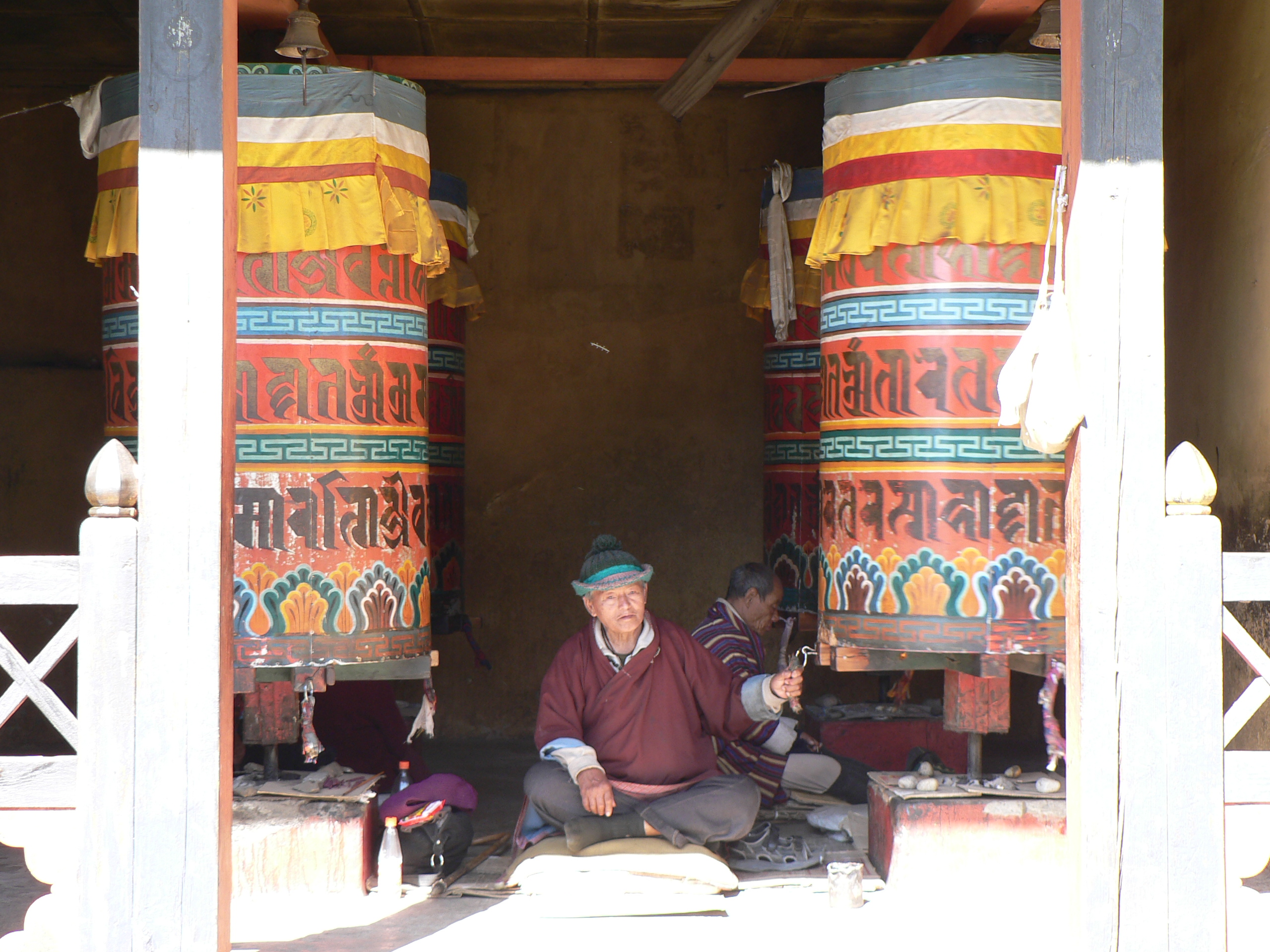
Prayer Wheels, Memorial Chorten, Thimphu.

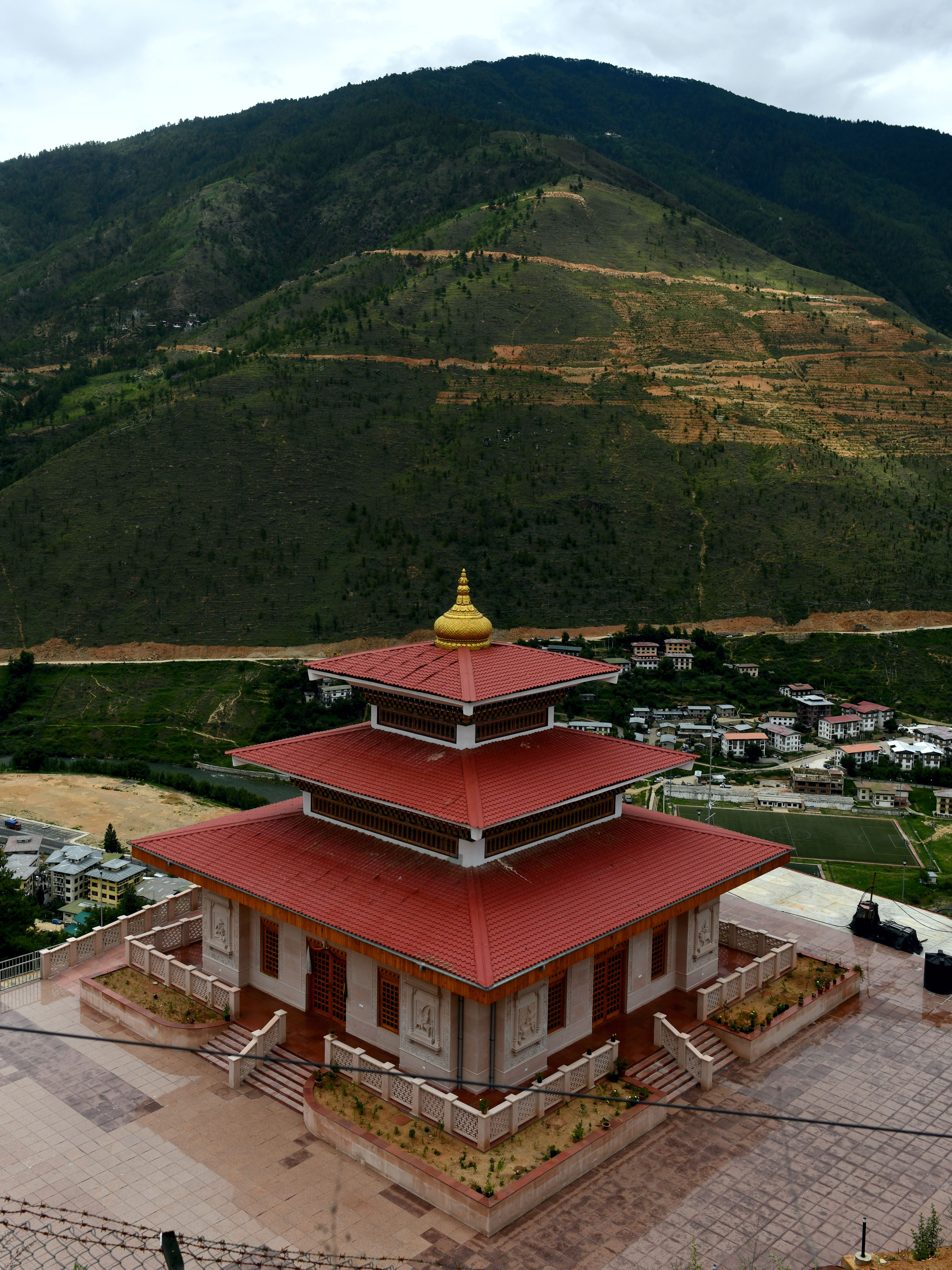
Hindu Dharma Samudaya Temple in Thimphu

Vajrayana Buddhism is the state religion and the dominant ethnic group is Drukpa of Kagyu Buddhism, while in southern Bhutan Hindus of Nepali ethnicity are dominant. The main monastic body with membership of 1,160 monks is headed by a chief abbot (presently Je Khenpo) who spends six months in Tashichhoe Dzong in Thimphu and the other six months in Punakha. A Council of Ecclesiastical Affairs, under the chairmanship of the chief abbot, is located in Thimphu, which is responsible for the management of the National Memorial Chorten in Thimphu, and all Buddhist meditation centres, schools of Buddhist studies and also central and district monastic bodies. The day-to-day affairs of the council are under the charge of the chief abbot.

== Education ==
It was only in the 1960s that roads were built in Bhutan and Thimphu when the Third King of Bhutan took the initiative after receiving education in it. Prior to that, education was limited to monastic teachings in monasteries, except for a few privileged people who went to Darjeeling to receive western-type education. Dzongkha is compulsory in all schools. Schools are co-educational and education is not compulsory but school education is virtually free. Now, education has spread to all parts of the country. Thimphu has several educational institutions from schooling level to the college level in several disciplines. There are more private schools in Thimphu than in any other place in Bhutan, which are all under the control of the Department of Education. The National Training Authority administers three technical institutes.

The Royal University of Bhutan (known as the RUB) located in the city was established in 2003. This university includes several colleges including the Institute for Language and Culture Studies (ILCS) which provides training to undergraduate students in national language, culture and traditions of Bhutan at Simtokha Dzong. Students who graduate from this school primarily become Dzongkha teachers. Also included is the Royal Institute of Health Sciences (RIHS), which provides training to nurses and technicians, and the Royal Institute of Management (RIM) which provides training in administrative and financial management to mid-level manager. Aside from the government run colleges, private schools and colleges have also been set up in Thimphu and other regions of the country.

With World Bank funding, an IT Park is proposed in an area of 50,000 square feet (4,600 m^{2}), in 1,700 acres (690 ha) of land at Babesa, within Thimphu's municipal limits. This facility shall have an incubation centre, shared technology centre and data centre without any manufacturing facility. It is a joint venture project of Thimphu Tech Park Pvt. Ltd., of Assetz Property Group Pvt. Ltd., of Singapore and Druk Holding & Investments Ltd of Bhutan.

== Transport ==
=== Roads ===
The layout and position of the city roads in Thimphu are dictated by its unique topography. Most premier roads, typically wide, are aligned in a north–south direction, parallel to the river; the most important artery is the Norzin Lam (Lam - road/street). Branch roads wind along the hill slopes leading to residential areas. Footpaths are also well laid with access to the commercial areas and the Wang Chu River. However, its entry point is at a narrow location from the south crossed by a wooden bridge. South of the bridge is the road to Paro, Punakha, Wangdue Phodrang, Tongsa and further to the east and north. The expressway which has been built has had a large impact on development, shifting land values, decreasing transportation costs, and increasing potential growth opportunity in the southern part of the valley.

Bhutan Transport Corporation runs a regular bus service from Siliguri (which along with nearby New Jalpaiguri station are the nearest railheads) in India. It takes about four hours to reach Phuentsholing. From there, buses ply to Thimphu every day. Taxis can also be hired.

The unique aspect of Thimphu roads and the traffic control over the road network is that it is one of the two national capitals in the world that does not have traffic lights (the other is Ngerulmud, Palau). Local authorities had installed a set of lights but before they became operational the lights were removed. Instead of traffic lights, the city takes pride in its traffic police that directs the oncoming traffic with their dance-like movement of their arms and hands. City Bus services operate throughout the day. There are plans to introduce tram services in the city.

=== Air ===
Thimphu is served by the only international airport of Bhutan, Paro Airport, which is about 54 kilometres (34 mi) away by road. Druk Air had its headquarters in Thimphu but now there is only a branch office. Druk Air is one of only two airlines flying into Bhutan excluding charter flights by Buddha Air and is a lifeline with the outside world for the Bhutanese people, also supporting emerging inbound tourism and export markets. The airline has in recent times been criticised for its unreliability, particularly from the Bhutanese tourism industry which is still in its infancy, and regards the very company upon which it relies as its biggest threat. Tashi Air is a more recent private airline in the country, commencing operations in 2011.

== Sports ==
The Bhutan Olympic Committee was created in November 1983 with the King of Bhutan as its president, with its headquarters in Thimphu. Following this recognition, Bhutan participated for the first time in the 1984 Olympic Games held in Los Angeles when three men and three women archers represented Bhutan. For each Olympic Summer Games since 1984, Bhutan has fielded male and female archers. They have never competed in the Winter Games; they also have never won an Olympic medal.

Archery (datse) is the national sport of Bhutan, which is played not only with traditional bows and arrows but also with modern archery techniques at the Changlimithang Sports and Archery Stadium in Thimphu. Archery is central to the cultural identity of the nation and as a result all tournaments are started with a ceremony. Women come to witness the sports in their colourful best attire and cheer their favorite teams. Men stand close to the target and taunt the players, if targets are missed. The targets are spaced at 140-metre (460 ft) intervals. Teams which win the tournaments celebrate with their supporters by singing and performing a dance jig. Archery is organized nationally within the Bhutan Archery Federation.

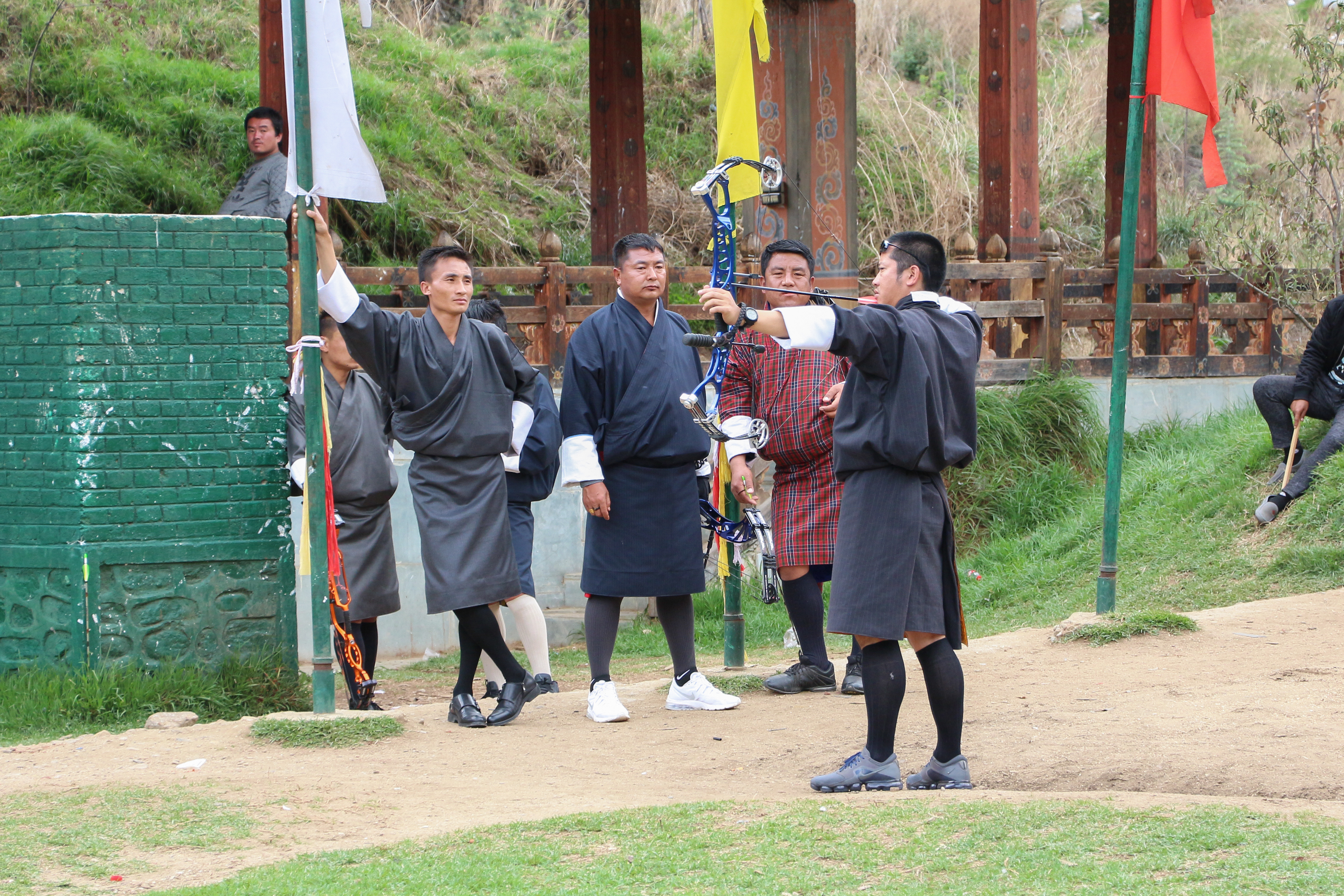
Archery competition in Thimphu.

Since monks are not permitted to participate in archery, they indulge in another popular sport called the daygo, a stone throwing sport which involves throwing flat circular stone like a discus. Another shot put type game known as pungdo is popular and is also played with big and heavy stones. One more typical Bhutanese game is the dart game, known locally as Khuru, which is played with short targets. The darts used in the game are made of a wood block set with a nail with fins of chicken feather.

Many modern sports are also played in the national stadium in Thimphu, in addition to locally popular sports mentioned earlier. The sports activities in vogue are football, basketball, golf, Kwon do (Bhutan earned a gold medal in this game in the South Asia Federation Games in 2004), squash, golf (popular among the elite middle class) and in recent years cricket. Thimphu has 12 cricket teams and two small golf courses; one near the India House and the other between the Tashichhoe Dzong and the National Library, known as the Royal Thimphu Golf Course (a nine-hole course), established at the initiative of King Jigme Dorji Wangchuk in 1971.

Changlimithang Stadium

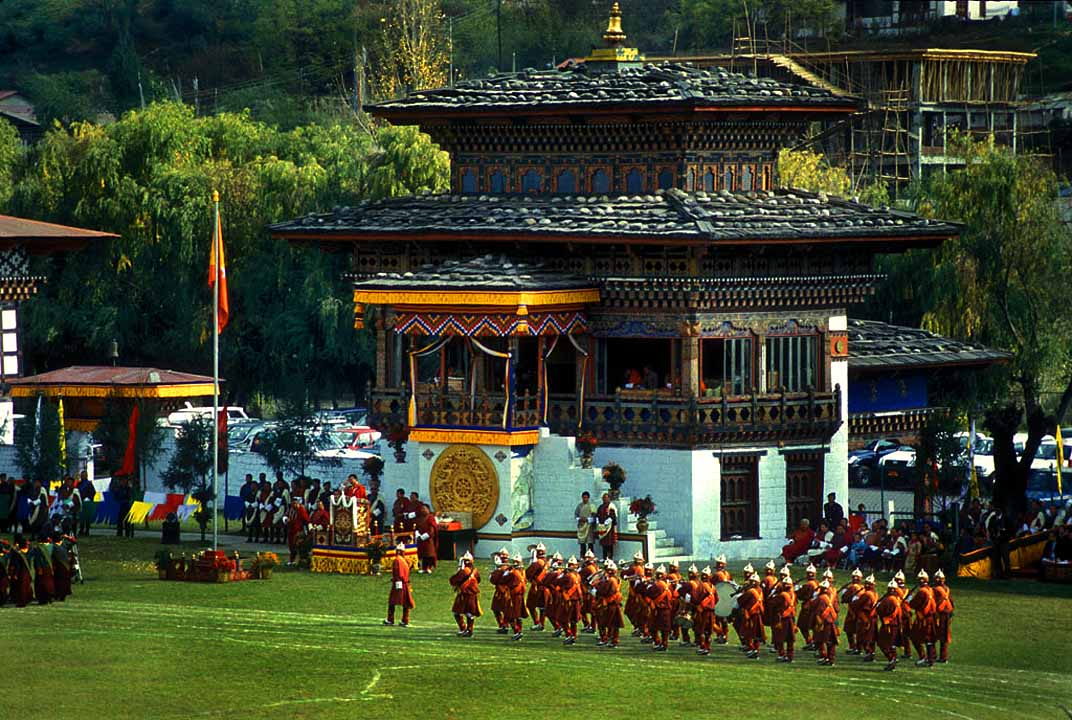
Changlimithang Stadium during a parade.

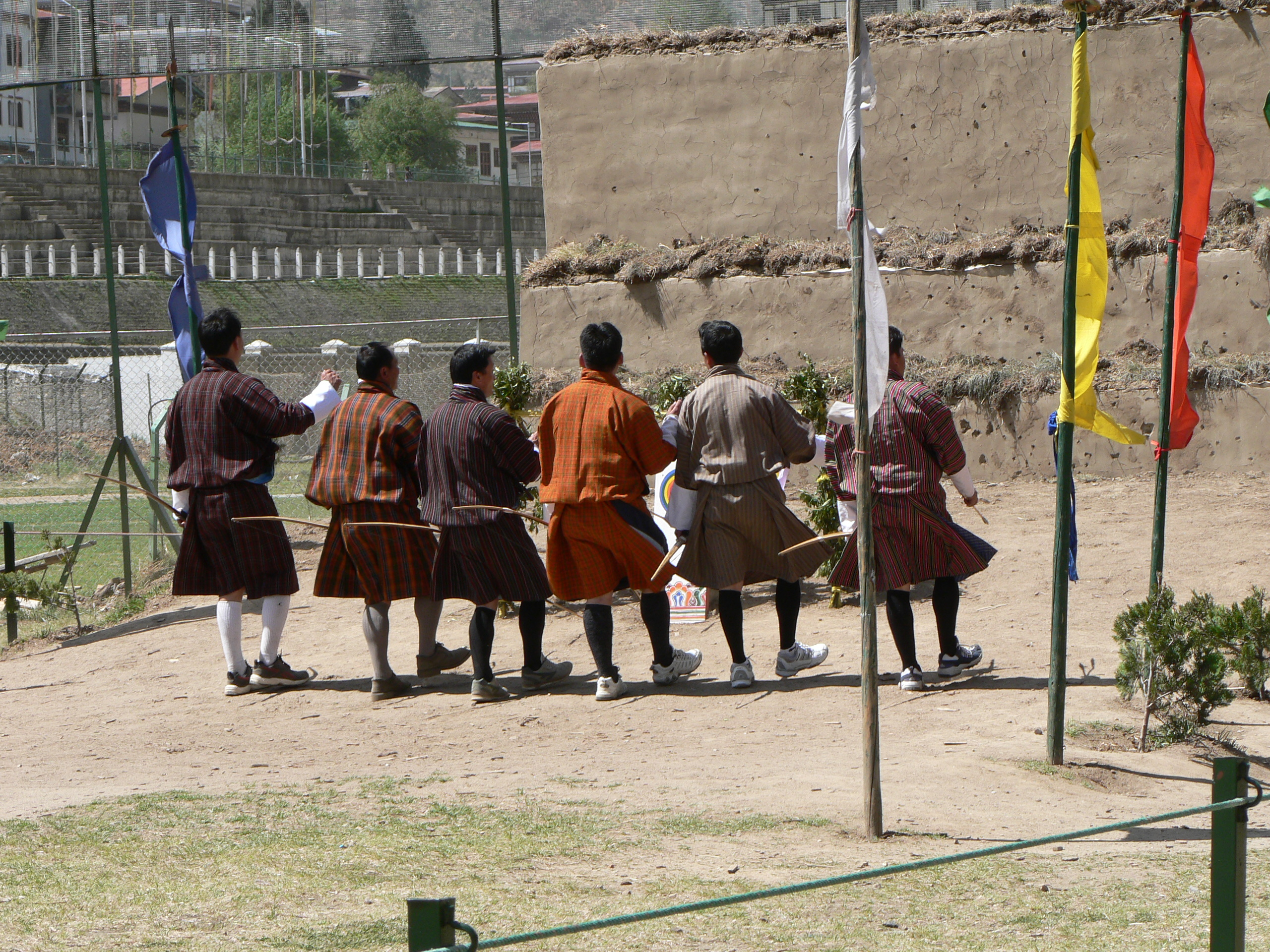
Archery dance after hitting bulls eye at the Changlimithang Stadium.

Changlimithang Stadium, a multi-purpose stadium in Thimphu, is the National Stadium. The stadium that was built in 1974 to celebrate the Coronation of the fourth Druk Gyalpo, King Jigme Singye Wangchuck in 1974. It had a capacity to hold 10,000 spectators. However, it was completely refurbished in 2007 to accommodate 25,000 spectators for the Centenary of Wangchuk dynasty rule in Bhutan and also the Coronation Celebrations of the fifth king of Bhutan, Jigme Khesar Namgyal Wangchuck, held on November 6, 2008. It now covers an area of about 11 hectares (27 acres). This was also the location where national celebrations were held from the time of the third King of Bhutan. Historicity of the Changlimithang ground is traced to the 1885 battle that established the political supremacy of Gongsar Ugyen Wangchuck, Bhutan's first king. Adjacent to the main stadium are the football ground, the cricket field and archery range. Numerous archery tournaments are held here with both the imported compound bows and traditional bamboo bows. The main stadium is used for multipurpose sports and other functions. A documentary film known as "The Other Final" was filmed based on a special football match arranged by FIFA that was played between the 202nd placed (out of 203 worldwide) Bhutan and 203rd-ranked Montserrat.

== Media ==
The Bhutan Broadcasting Service was established in 1973 as a radio service, broadcasting on short wave nationally, and on the FM band, in Thimphu. It is run by the Government of Bhutan. The service started television broadcasts and satellite channels in 1999, during the coronation of the fourth king of Bhutan. Bhutan was then the last country in the world to introduce television. As part of the King's modernization program, cable television was introduced shortly after. In 2002, there were 42 TV channels under two cable operators.

Kuensel was first started in Thimphu as a government bulletin in 1965, and then became a national weekly in 1986 and was the only newspaper in Bhutan until 2006 when two other newspapers, namely the Bhutan Times and Bhutan Observer, were introduced. Kuensel, which was initially government-owned, became an autonomous corporation incorporating the Royal Government Press, in 1992. It publishes the newspaper Kuensel in English, Nepali and Dzongkha (Bhutanese) languages.

Radio Valley FM. 99.9, a new private radio station, has started broadcasting in Thimphu. This is in addition to the older stations of BBS and Kuzoo FM.

== See also ==
- Mountain Echoes: a Literary Festival (20–23 May 2011) Tarayana Centre.
- Punakha, the former capital of Bhutan
- Dorji Wangmo Wangchuck
