= Motithang =

- Demkhong of Thimphu
- Location of Motithang in Thimphu

- Location within Bhutan
- Coordinates: 27°28′28″N 89°37′22″E
- Country: Bhutan
- District: Thimphu District
- City: Thimphu

Government
  - Thrompon: Ugyen Dorji
  - Thuemi: Pema Yangzom

Motithang is a central-western suburb of Thimphu, Bhutan. The Chubachu River divides the district from Kawajangsa further north and Chubachu district lies to the east.

Meaning "the meadow of pearls", the area only developed as a residential area in the 1980s, following the initial establishment of the Hotel Motithang in 1974, on the occasion of the coronation of Jigme Singye Wangchuck.

== Governance ==
Motithang is a demkhong under Thimphu, electing a Thuemi/Tshogpa to the Thromde Tshogde for a five-year term. There are 500 registered voters in the demkhong.

The first Thuemi of Motithang was Dorji Dema, running uncontested with 31 yes votes in 2011. He would be reelected in 2016 with 113 yeses to 14 noes. In April 2021, a Thuemi would not be elected in the 2021 Bhutanese local elections as the Election Commission of Bhutan would disqualify the candidate for party membership. The thromde council would appoint Rinzin Dorji from Changangkha demkhong as interim Thuemi until July 20, 2022 where Pema Yangzom would be elected. Pema Yangzom would win reelection in the 2026-27 Bhutanese local elections with 166 yeses to 18 noes in an uncontested election.

== Points of interest ==
The demkhong contains several notable state guest houses such as the Hotel Motithang, Kungacholing and Lhundupling, Rapten Apartments and the Amankora Thimphu. It also contains the National Commission for Cultural Affairs, a UNICEF station and several grocery stores, including the Lhatshog supermarket. There is also a notable takin wildlife sanctuary in the district, named Motithang Takin Preserve.

Ozone Park, formerly Motithang Park is a park that was established in 2004, it was renamed in 2017 to commemorate the 30th anniversary of the signing of the Montreal Protocol with the park being upgraded to add Ozone themed activities.

=== Ministers' Enclave ===
The Ministers' Enclave (Roman Dzongkha:Lhenga Dhensa) is a residential compound used by the incumbent ministers of Bhutan, Auditor General of the Royal Audit Authority, Chief of the Election Commission of Bhutan, Chair of the Royal Civil Service Commission, Chair of the Anti-Corruption Commission, Chief Justice of the Supreme Court of Bhutan, Leader of the Opposition, and Chairperson of the National Council. It includes the Raven State Guest House, the official residence of the Prime Minister of Bhutan.

== Infrastructure ==
National Veterinary Hospital is the a veterinary hospital on Thori Lam near Ozone Park, being opened on February 5, 2018. Schools include Motithang Higher Secondary School and Jigme Namgyel Lower Secondary School.

Motithang LPG depot is an Liquefied petroleum gas cylinder depot operated by the Bhutan Oil Distributors under the Trashi Group. It is one of the primary depots for LPG cylinders in Thimphu and was previously operated by the Regional Trade and Industries Office.
