= Motithang Takin Preserve =

Wildlife reserve area in Thimphu, Bhutan

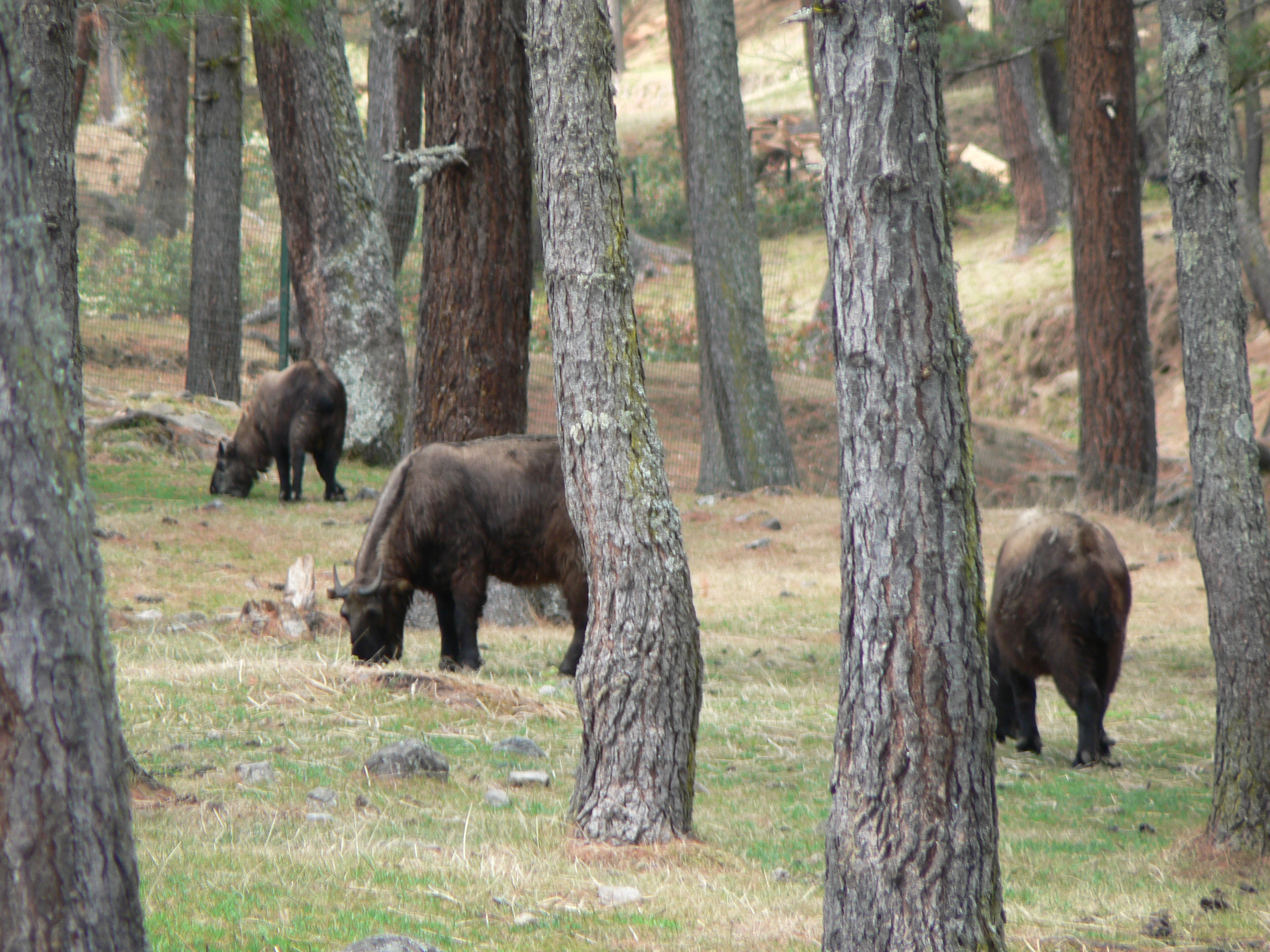
- Takins in Motithang Takin Preserve

- Location within Bhutan
- Location: Thimphu, Bhutan
- Coordinates: 27°28′54″N 89°36′40″E
- Area: .034 km^{2} (0.013 sq mi)

Royal Takin Preserve, located in the Motithang district of Thimphu, Bhutan is a wildlife reserve area for Bhutan takin, the national animal of Bhutan. Originally a mini-zoo, it was converted into a preserve when it was discovered that the animals refrained from inhabiting the surrounding forest even when set free. The reason for declaring takin as a national animal of Bhutan on 25 November 2005 (Budorcas taxicolor) is attributed to a legend of the animal's creation in Bhutan in the 15th century by Lama Drukpa Kunley.

== Legend ==
The local mythology related to declaring takin as the national animal of Bhutan is dated to the 15th century. A Tibetan saint by the name Drukpa Kunley, popularly called by the epithet "The Divine Madman" is credited with creating the takin with unique features. Drukpa Kunley, who was not only a religious preacher but also a proficient tantric, was requested by the people of Bhutan during one of his religious lectures to conjure a miracle before them. The saint agreed to do so provided he was fed for lunch, a whole cow and a whole goat. Once served, he devoured the food of both animals and left out the bones. He then took out the head of the goat and fixed it to the skeleton of the cow and uttered abracadabra and the magic worked. With a snap, he created a live animal, which had the head of the goat and the body of the cow. The animal sprang up and moved on to the meadows to graze. The animal was then given the name dong gyem tsey (takin). Since then this animal has been a common sight in the hills of Bhutan. Because of this magical creation with high religious connotation, the animal has been adopted as the national animal of Bhutan.

== Background ==
When a small number of takin were confined in a "mini-zoo" in Thimphu, the King of Bhutan felt that it was improper for a Buddhist country to confine animals for religious and environmental reasons. He therefore ordered the release of the animals and the closure of the mini-zoo. To everyone's surprise, the takin, known for their docile behavior, refused to leave the immediate area, and strayed in the streets of Thimphu in search of food for weeks.

Given that the animals had become virtually domesticated, it was decided to keep them in an enclosed, forested habitat at the edge of Thimphu and thus the takin preserve came to be established in the Motithang neighborhood. An area of 3.4 hectares (8.4 acres) was demarcated and fenced for the preserve. Improvements were implemented in 2004, a collaborative effort of the Royal Government of Bhutan and World Wide Fund, WWF (Bhutan), including a traditionally styled entrance gate, a small information center, signage and trash receptacles. Small openings in the fencing allow photo opportunities (intended) along with unregulated hand-feeding (unintended). As a result, most of the captive animals in the enclosure are obese. The preserve also holds a few sambar and barking deer. The Motithang Takin Reserve has been an integral part of Thimphu city and is an ongoing visitor attraction. NCD plans to expand the collection of the preserve by introducing other rarely seen animals of Bhutan such as the red panda, and the Himalayan serow.

== Habitat ==
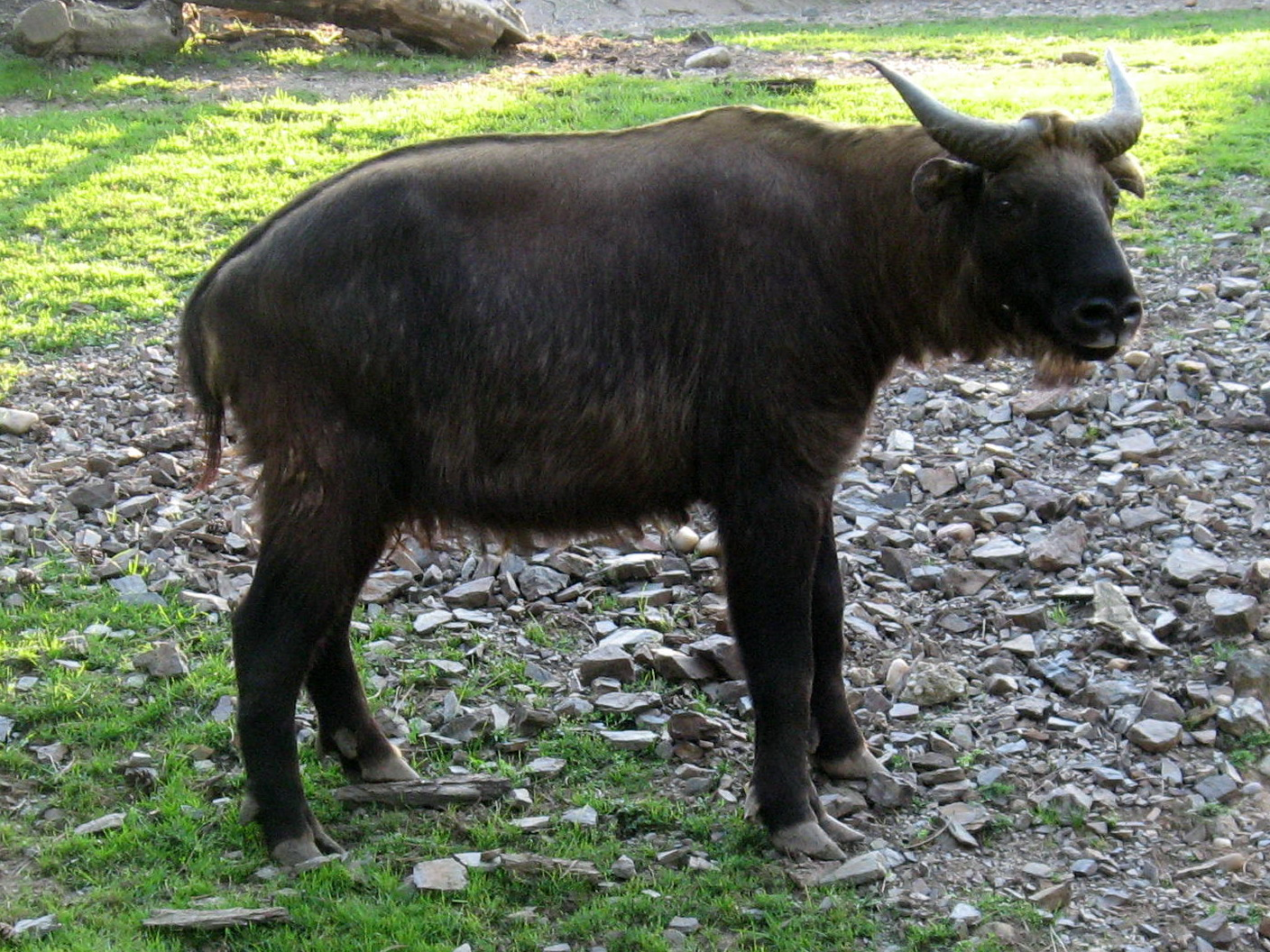
Takin – national animal of Bhutan

Takin attract attention due to their unusual appearance; taxonomists were originally uncertain of this animal's phylogeny and many people describe it as a "bee-stung moose". Bhutan takin (Budorcas taxicolor whitei) is listed as a vulnerable species of goat-antelope, native to Bhutan, India and the People's Republic of China.

Its habitat is alpine meadows during the summer season, above an altitude of 3,700 metres (12,100 ft), where they feed primarily on grasses. During the summer monsoon season, the lower elevation forests are inhospitable for takin due to the abundance of leeches, mosquitoes, and horseflies. Alpine meadows provide rich grazing for takin and as a result some males have been reported to weigh as much as a tonne. Courtship and mating occur in July and August. After a gestation period of about 8 months, a single calf is born, usually in late February or March. Adult takin have a golden yellow and brownish coat; calves are initially black in colour. As the rainy season tapers, the animals move down to elevations of 2,000 metres (6,600 ft) and 3,000 metres (9,800 ft) to browse during the winter season on temperate vegetation of broad leaf forests.

== Threats ==
Takin have little economic value; they provide a traditional medicinal use by women to help them during child birth. and are of keen interest to a relatively small but uncertain number of trekkers annually in Bhutan.

Genetic health of the animals in the takin preserve is believed to be on the decline due to inbreeding, according to the Nature Conservation Division (NCD) of the Ministry of Agriculture of Bhutan (NCD). The NCD is planning to introduce fresh genes of one male and two female takin from the wild. Wild populations of takin are believed to be stable, though there are no published studies to confirm this, and no one knows how climate change will affect the population of this species in Bhutan. The only known threats they face are from predators and very occasional poaching.

== Gallery ==
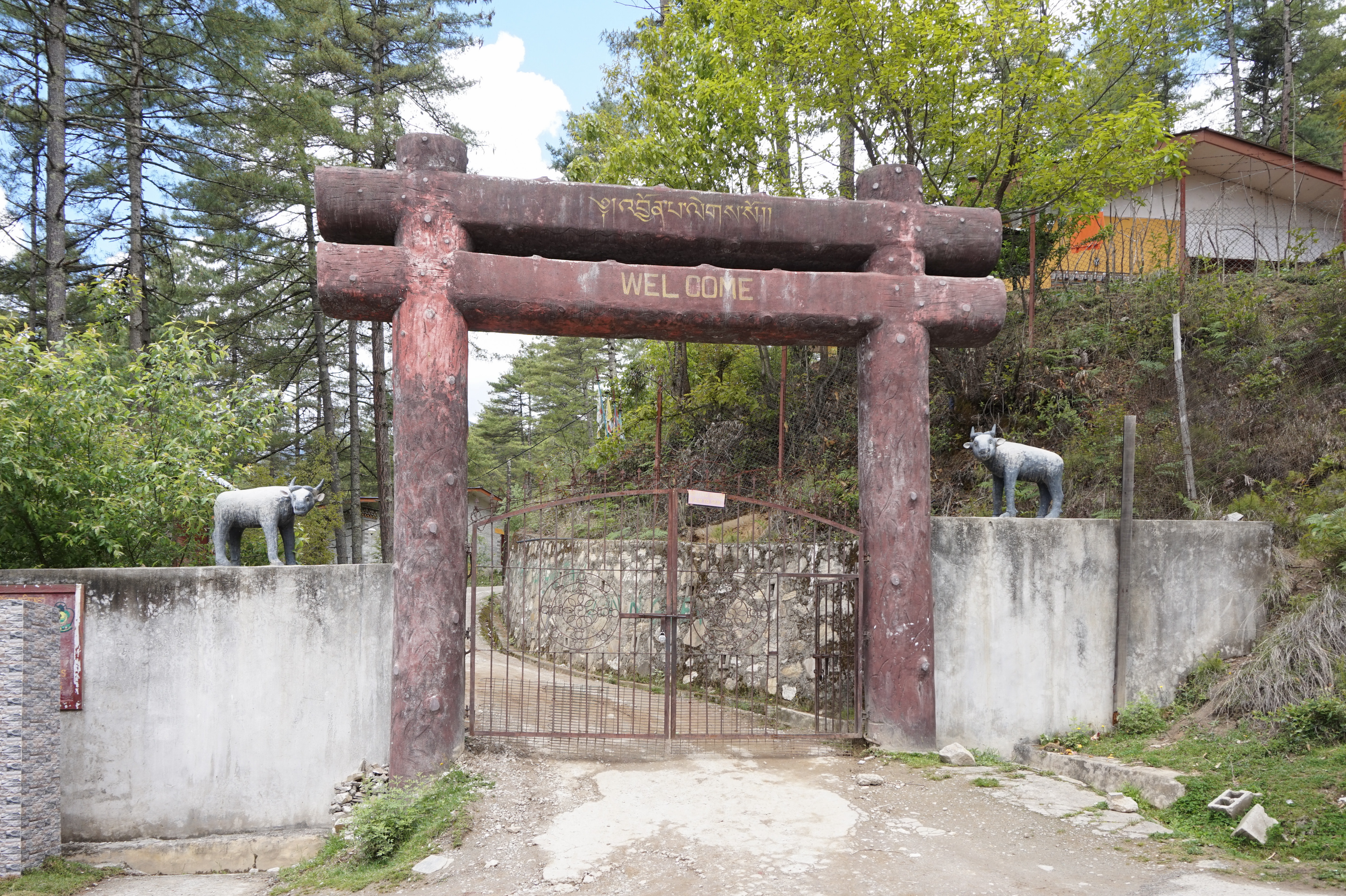
Entrance of the preserve

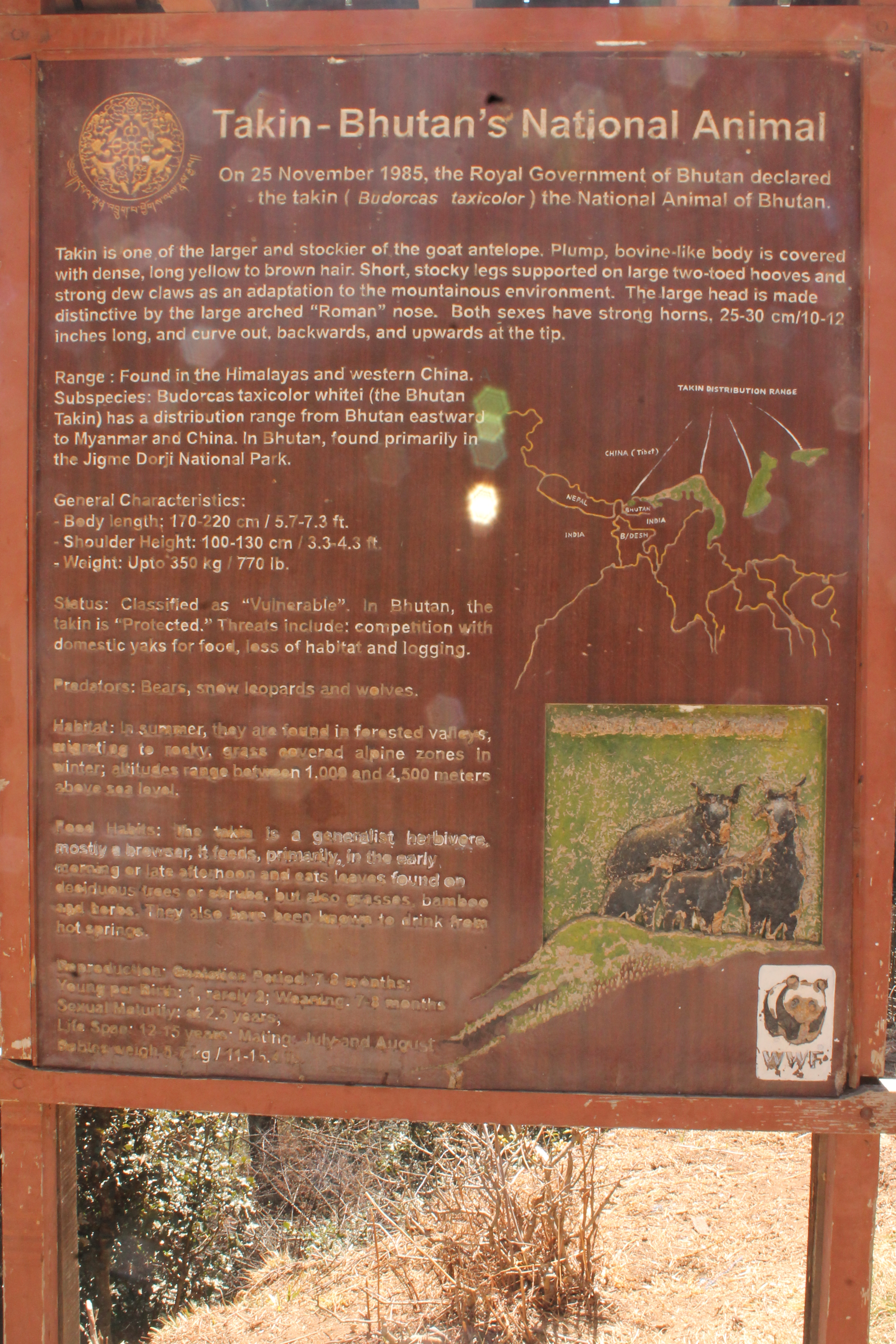
A board at Motithang Takin Preserve giving description about Bhutan Takin

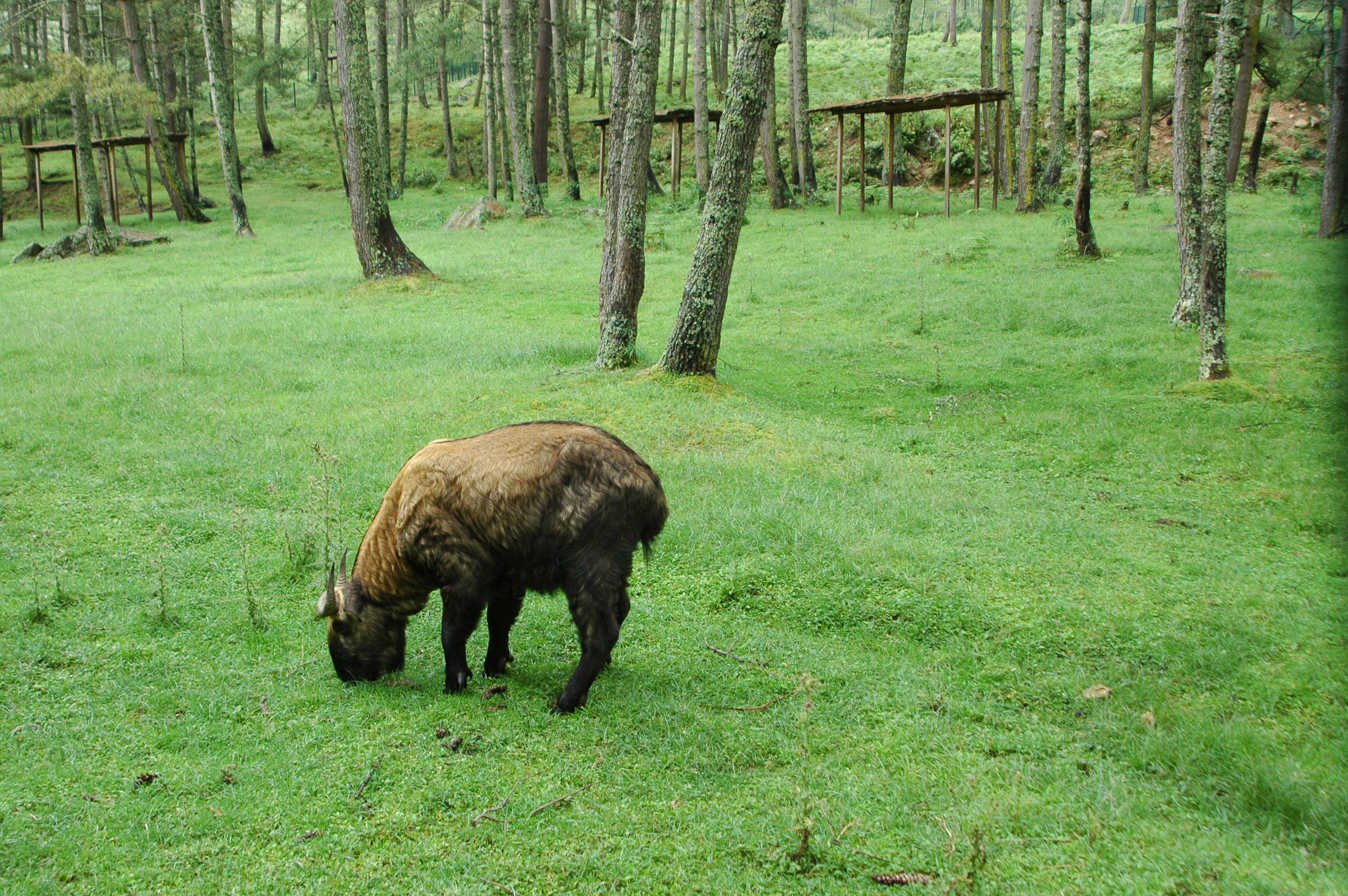
Takin, the national animal of Bhutan, grazing in the preserve

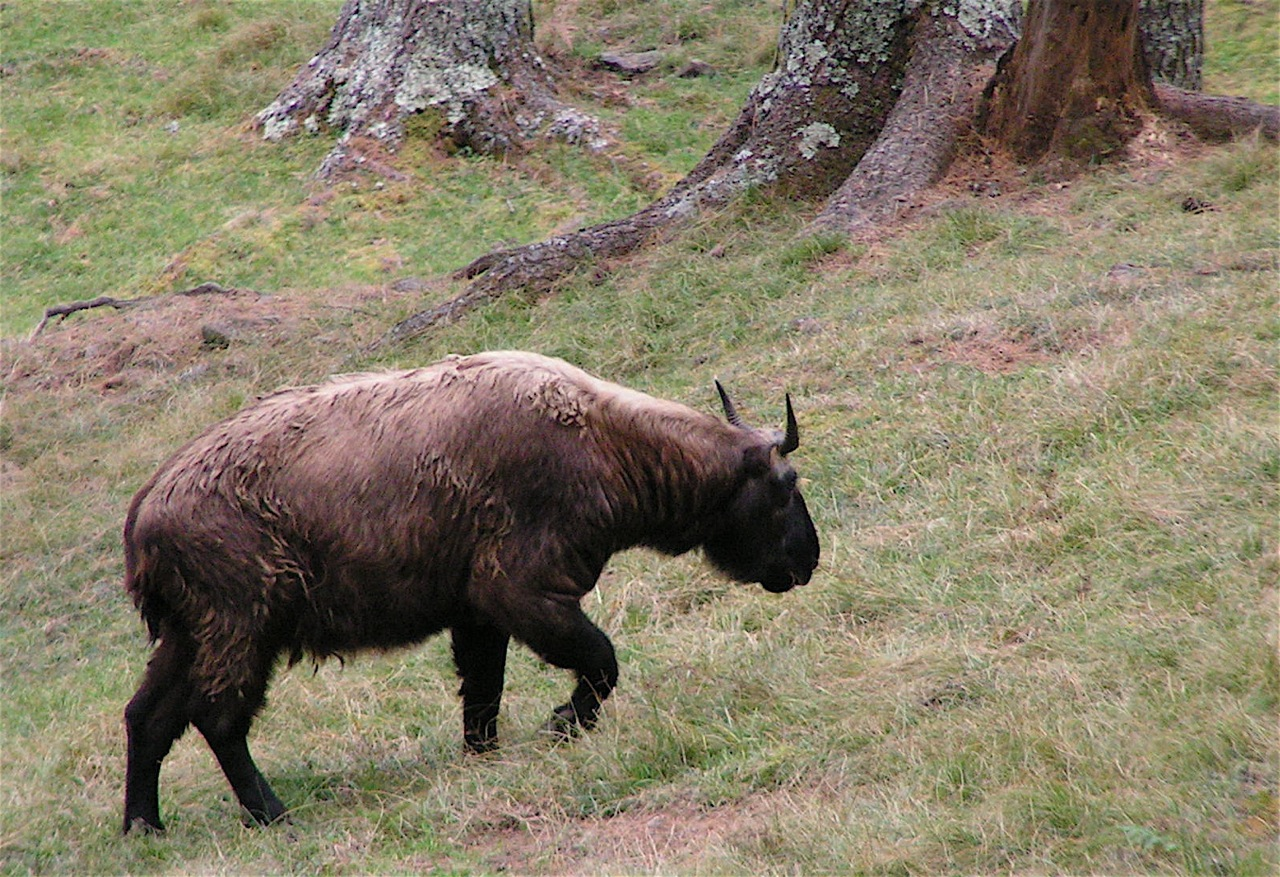
A takin going up hill in the preserve

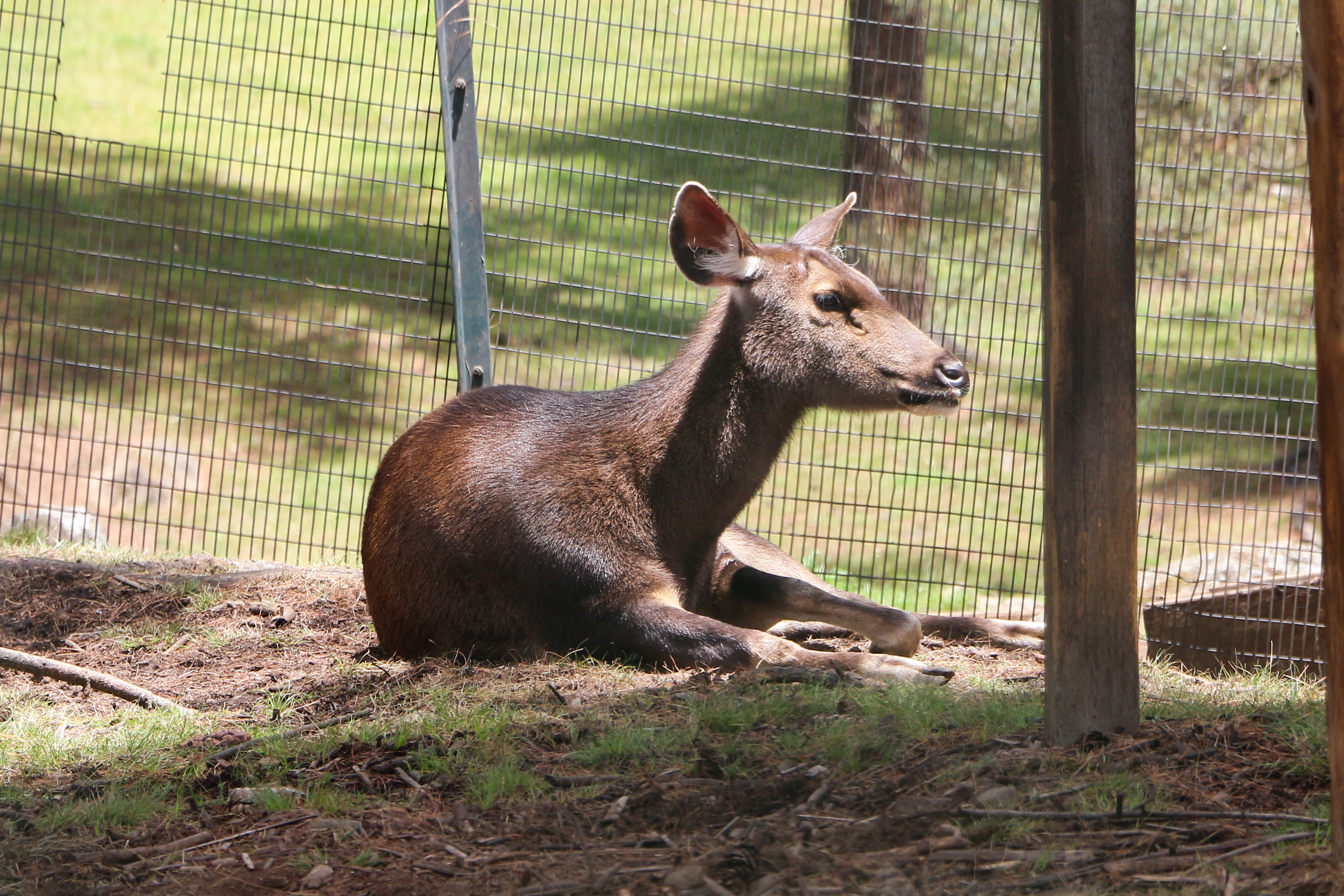
A Samba deer in the preserve

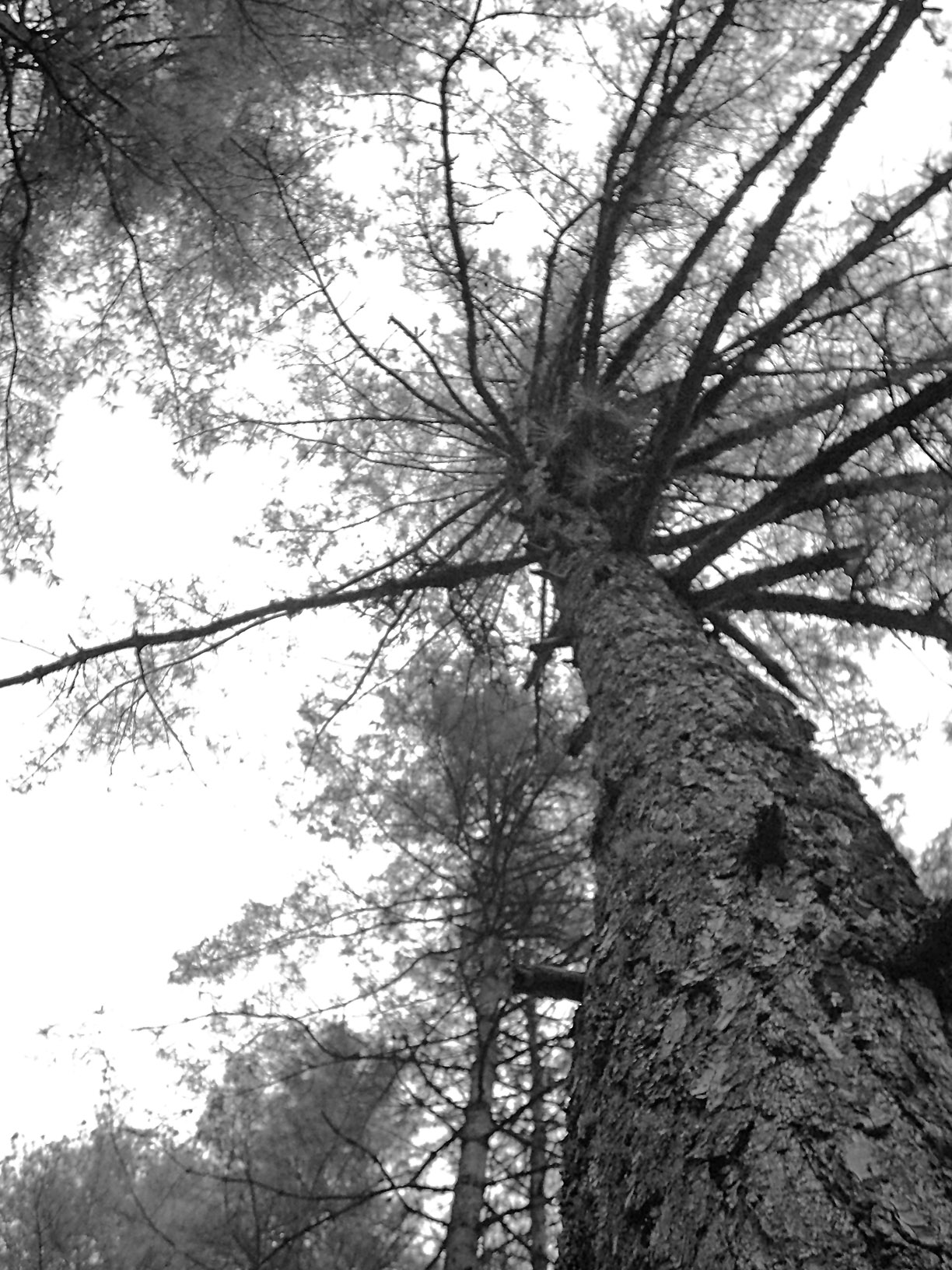
A tree in the Motithang Takin Preserve

== Bibliography ==
- Brown, Lindsey; Bradley Mayhew; Stan Armington; Richard Whitecross (2007). Bhutan. Lonely Planet. p. 87. ISBN 978-1-74059-529-2.
