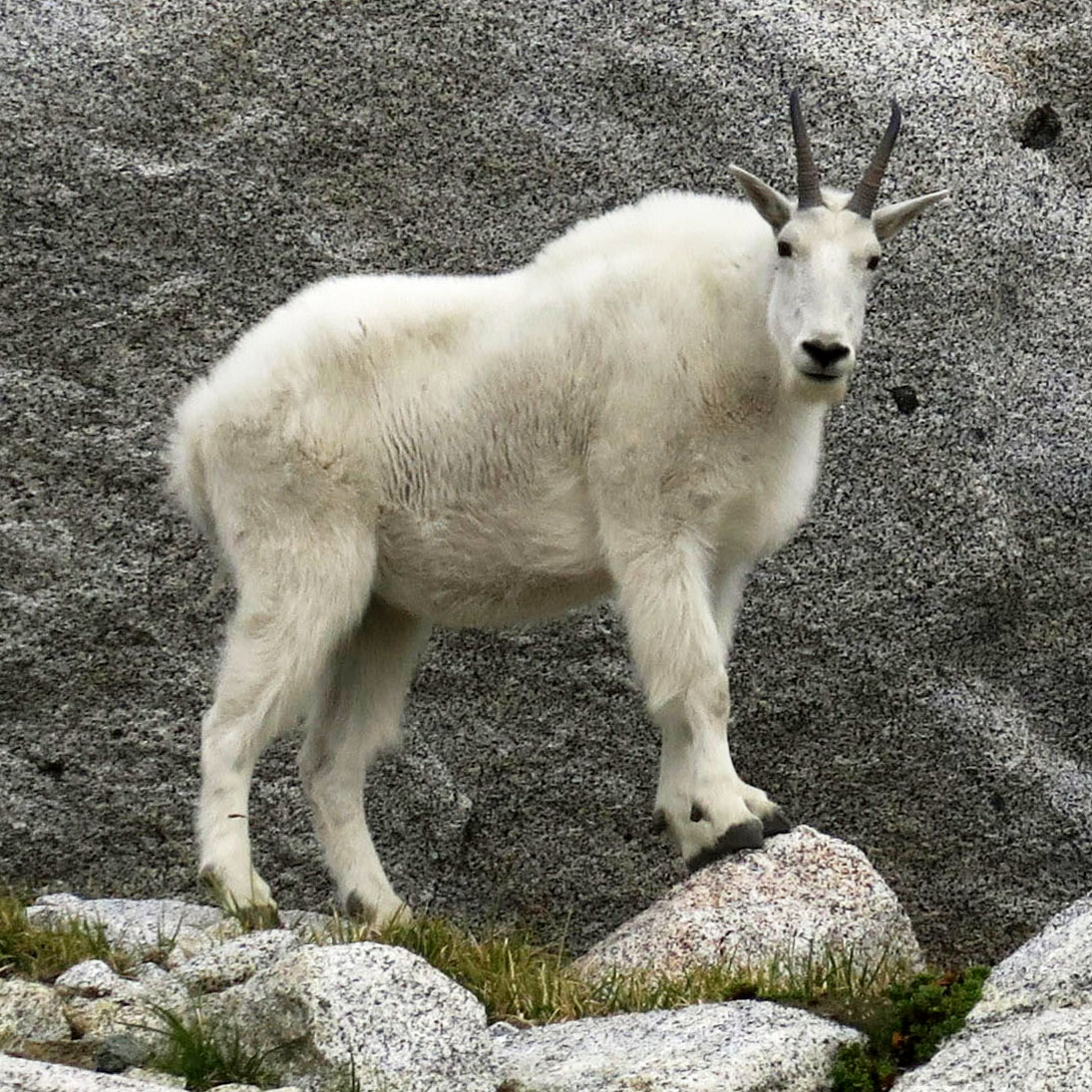
- Mountain goat in the Cascades

Conservation status
- Least Concern (IUCN 3.1)

Scientific classification
- Kingdom: Animalia
- Phylum: Chordata
- Class: Mammalia
- Order: Artiodactyla
- Family: Bovidae
- Subfamily: Caprinae
- Genus: Oreamnos
- Species: O. americanus

Binomial name
- Oreamnos americanus (Blainville, 1816)

Synonyms
- Mazama dorsata Rafinesque, 1817; R[upicapra]. americanus de Blainville, 1816

= Mountain goat =

Species of mammal

The mountain goat (Oreamnos americanus), also known as the Rocky Mountain goat, is a cloven-footed mammal that is endemic to the remote and rugged mountainous areas of western North America. A subalpine to truly alpine species, it is a sure-footed climber commonly seen on sheer rock faces, near-vertical cliffs and icy passages. Mountain goats generally avoid venturing down into lower elevations—except during seasonal food shortages or during particularly bad weather—as the extreme elevation of their habitat is the primary defense against predators such as black and brown bears, pumas and wolves.

Despite its vernacular name and both genera being in the same subfamily (Caprinae), the mountain goat is not a member of Capra, the genus that includes all true goats (such as the wild goat (Capra aegagrus), from which the domestic goat is derived); rather, it is more closely allied with the other bovids known as "goat-antelopes", including the European chamois (Rupicapra), the gorals (Naemorhedus), the takins (Budorcas) and the serows (Capricornis), of Japan and eastern South Asia.

== Classification and evolution ==
The mountain goat is an even-toed ungulate of the order Artiodactyla and the family Bovidae (along with antelopes, gazelles, and cattle). It belongs to the subfamily Caprinae, along with true goats, wild sheep, the chamois, the muskox and other species. The takins of the Himalayan region, while not a sister lineage of the mountain goat, are nonetheless very closely related and almost coeval to the mountain goat; they evolved in parallel from an ancestral goat. Other members of this group are the bharal, the true goats, and the Himalayan tahr. The sheep lineage is also very closely related, while the muskox lineage is somewhat more distant. The mountain goats probably diverged from their relatives in the late Tortonian, some 7.5 to 8 million years ago.

Given that all major caprine lineages emerged in the Late Miocene and contain at least one but usually several species from the eastern Himalayan region, their most likely place of origin is between today's Tibet and Mongolia or nearby. The mountain goat's ancestors thus probably crossed the Bering Strait after they split from their relatives, presumably before the Wisconsinian glaciation. No Pliocene mountain goats have been identified yet; the known fossil record is fairly recent, entirely from North America, and barely differs from the living animals. In the Pleistocene era, the small prehistoric mountain goat Oreamnos harringtoni lived in the southern Rocky Mountains. Ancient DNA studies suggest that this was the sister species of the living mountain goat, not its ancestor; consequently, the living species would also date back to the Pleistocene at least.

The mountain goat is the only living species in the genus Oreamnos. The name Oreamnos is derived from the Greek term ὄρος óros (stem ore-) meaning "mountain" (or, alternatively, oreas "mountain nymph") and the word ἀμνός amnós meaning "lamb".

== General appearance and characteristics ==
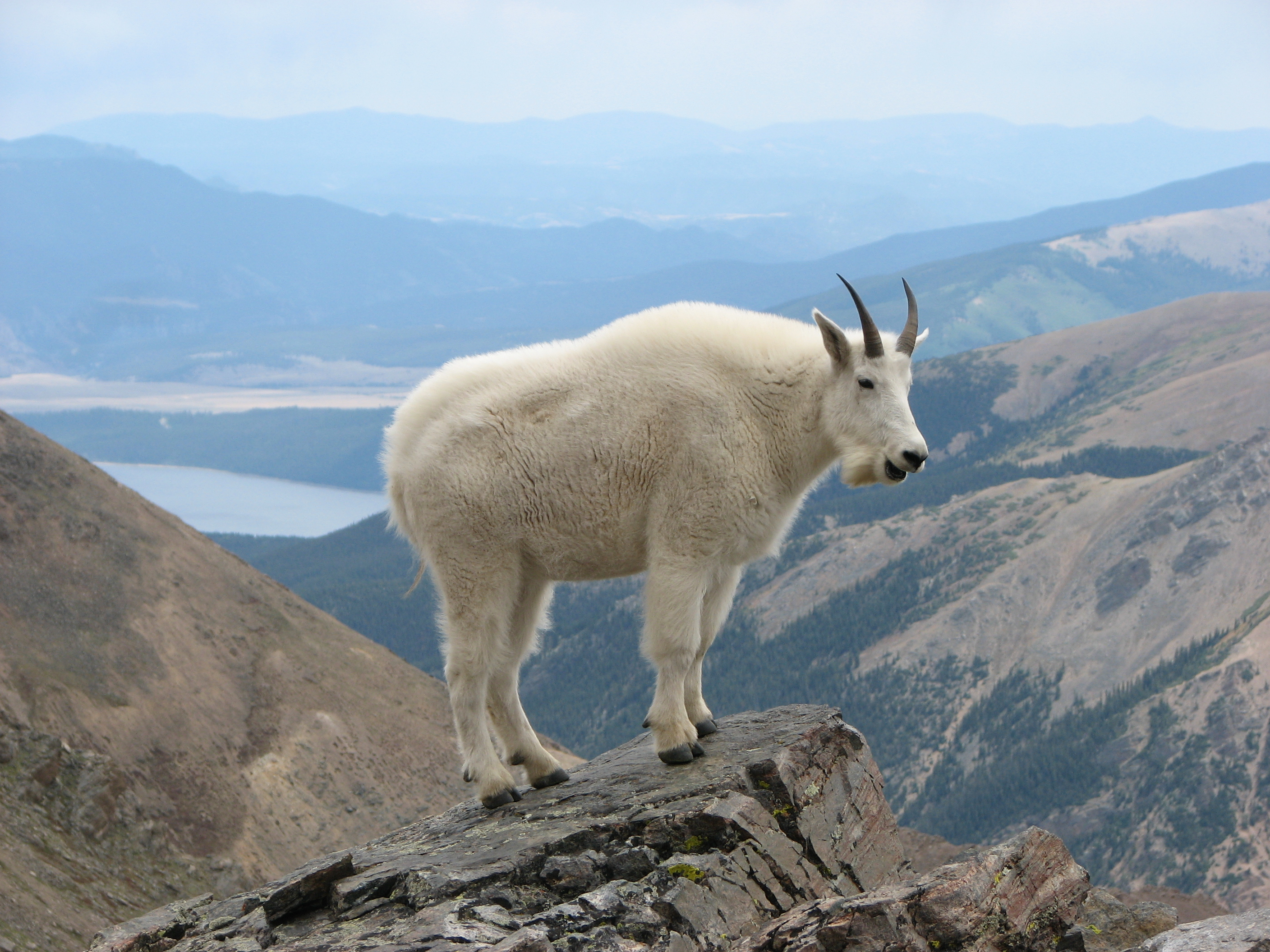
Mountain goat on Mount Massive, Colorado, United States

Both male and female mountain goats have beards, short tails, and long black horns, 15–28 cm (5.9–11 in) in length, which contain yearly growth rings. They are protected from the elements by their woolly greyish white double coats. The fine, dense wool of their undercoats is covered by an outer layer of longer, hollow hairs. Mountain goats molt in spring by rubbing against rocks and trees, with the adult billies shedding their extra wool first and the pregnant nannies shedding last. Their coats help them to withstand winter temperatures as low as −46 °C (−51 °F) and winds of up to 160 kilometres per hour (99 mph).

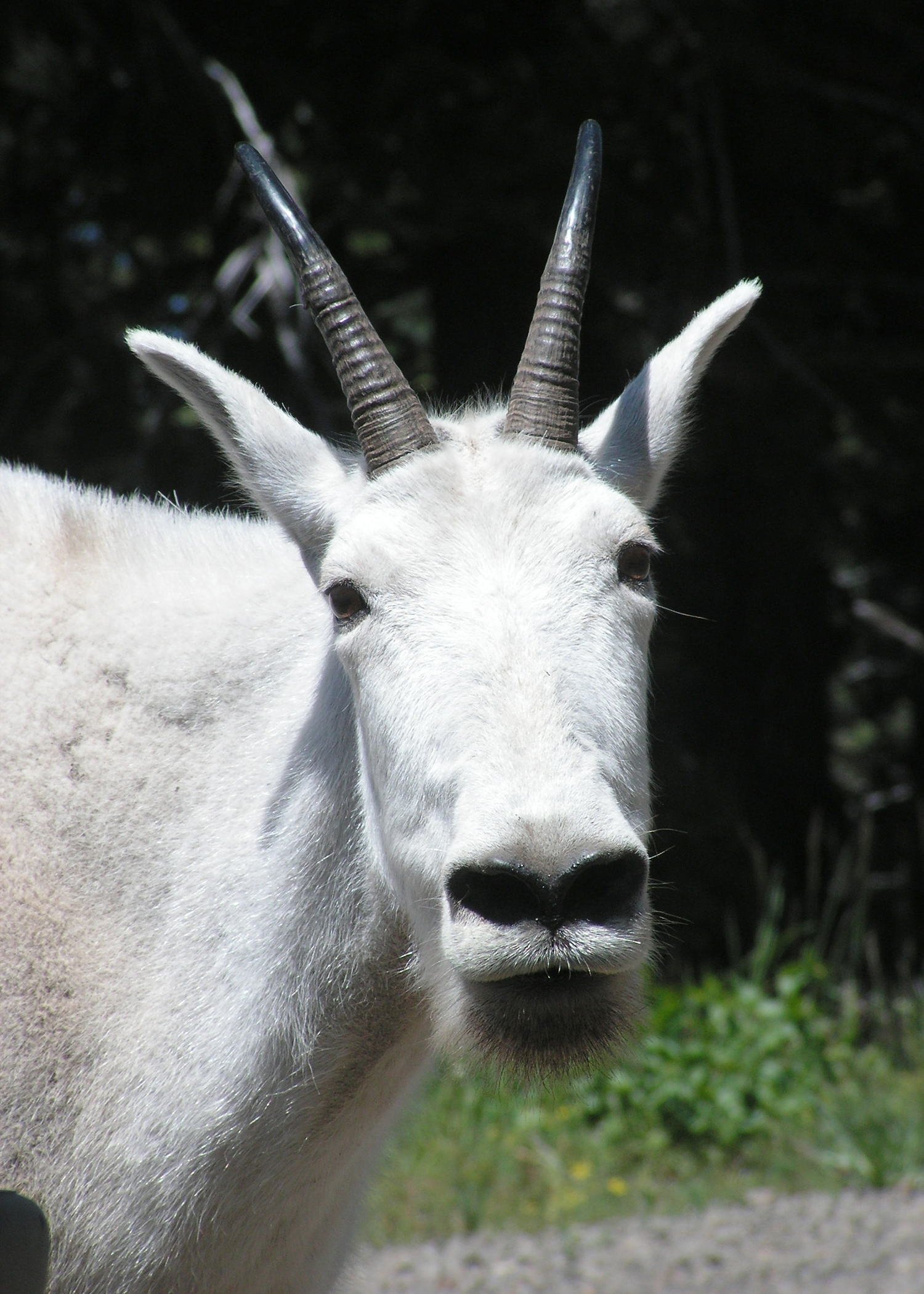
Close-up of head

A male goat stands about 1 m (3.3 ft) at the shoulder to the waist and can weigh considerably more than the female (around 30% more in some cases). Male goats also have longer horns and longer beards than females. The head-and-body length can range from 120–179 cm (47–70 in), with a small tail adding 10–20 cm (3.9–7.9 in).

The mountain goat's feet are well-suited for climbing steep, rocky slopes with pitches exceeding 60°, with inner pads that provide traction and cloven hooves that can spread apart. The tips of their feet have sharp dewclaws that keep them from slipping. They have powerful shoulder and neck muscles that help propel them up steep slopes. Based on a field recording in the Rocky Mountains of Canada of a mountain goat climbing a 45-degree slope, researchers were able to measure the goat's whole body movement as it climbed. Researchers observed that when the goat propelled itself forward, it extended its back legs and the front legs were tucked close up to its chest during its first phase. During the second phase, the goat raised its back legs near to its chest, while the front leg's humerus stayed locked in a persistent location relative to the goat's chest, therefore allowing the elbow to be detained in close proximity to the whole body's center of balance. Extension of the elbow and carpal joints resulted in a vertical translation of the center of mass up the mountain slope.

== Range and habitat ==
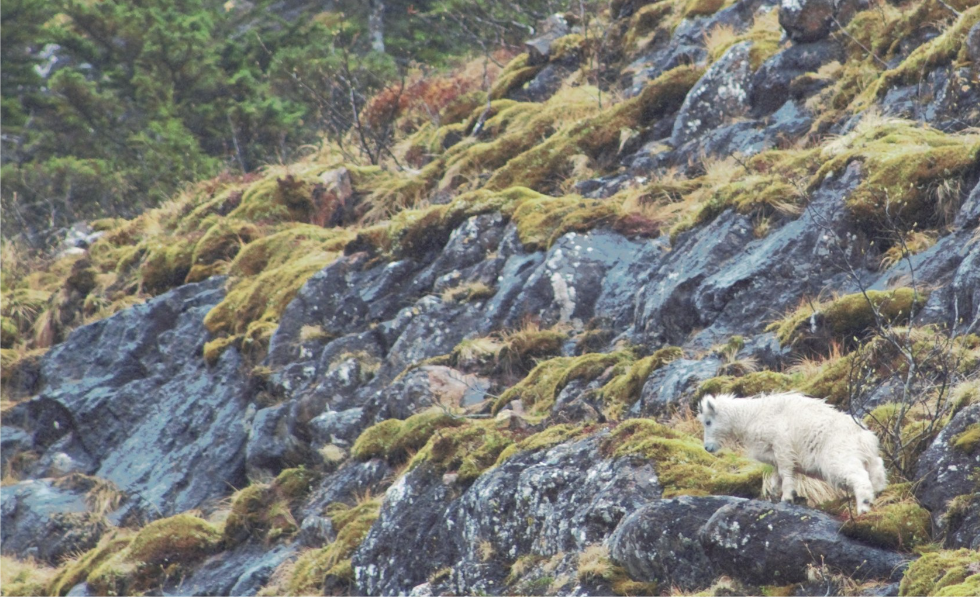
Kenai National Wildlife Refuge, Alaska

The mountain goat inhabits the Rocky Mountains and Cascade Range and other mountain regions of the Western Cordillera of North America, from Washington, Idaho and Montana through British Columbia and Alberta, into the southern Yukon and southeastern Alaska. British Columbia contains half of the world's population of mountain goats. Its northernmost range has been modelled to be in the Talkeetna Mountains in south-central Alaska. Introduced populations can also be found in such areas as Idaho, Wyoming, Utah, Nevada, Oregon, Colorado, South Dakota, and the Olympic Peninsula of Washington.

Mountain goats are the largest mammals found in their high-altitude habitats, which can exceed elevations of 13,000 ft (4,000 m). They sometimes descend to sea level in coastal areas although they are primarily an alpine and subalpine species. The animals usually stay above the tree line throughout the year but they will migrate seasonally to higher or lower elevations within that range. Winter migrations to low-elevation mineral licks often take them several kilometers through forested areas.

== Movement patterns ==
Daily movements by individual mountain goats are primarily confined to areas on the same mountain face, drainage basin, or alpine opening. Daily movements reflect an individual's needs for foraging, resting, thermoregulation and security from predators or disturbance. Seasonal movements primarily reflect nutritional needs (such as movements to and from mineral licks/salt lick), reproductive needs (in other words, movement of pre-parturient females to "kidding" areas; movement to rutting areas), and climatic influences (including movement to areas in response to foraging conditions). In general, seasonal movements are likely to exhibit a strong elevational component, whereby lower, forested elevations are used during the spring-summer (security cover effects) to access lower elevation mineral licks, and during winter (thermal cover effects) to access forage. The farthest movements are expected to be by dispersing mountain goats. Such movements are likely to involve mountain goats crossing forested valleys as they move between mountain blocks.

== Diet ==
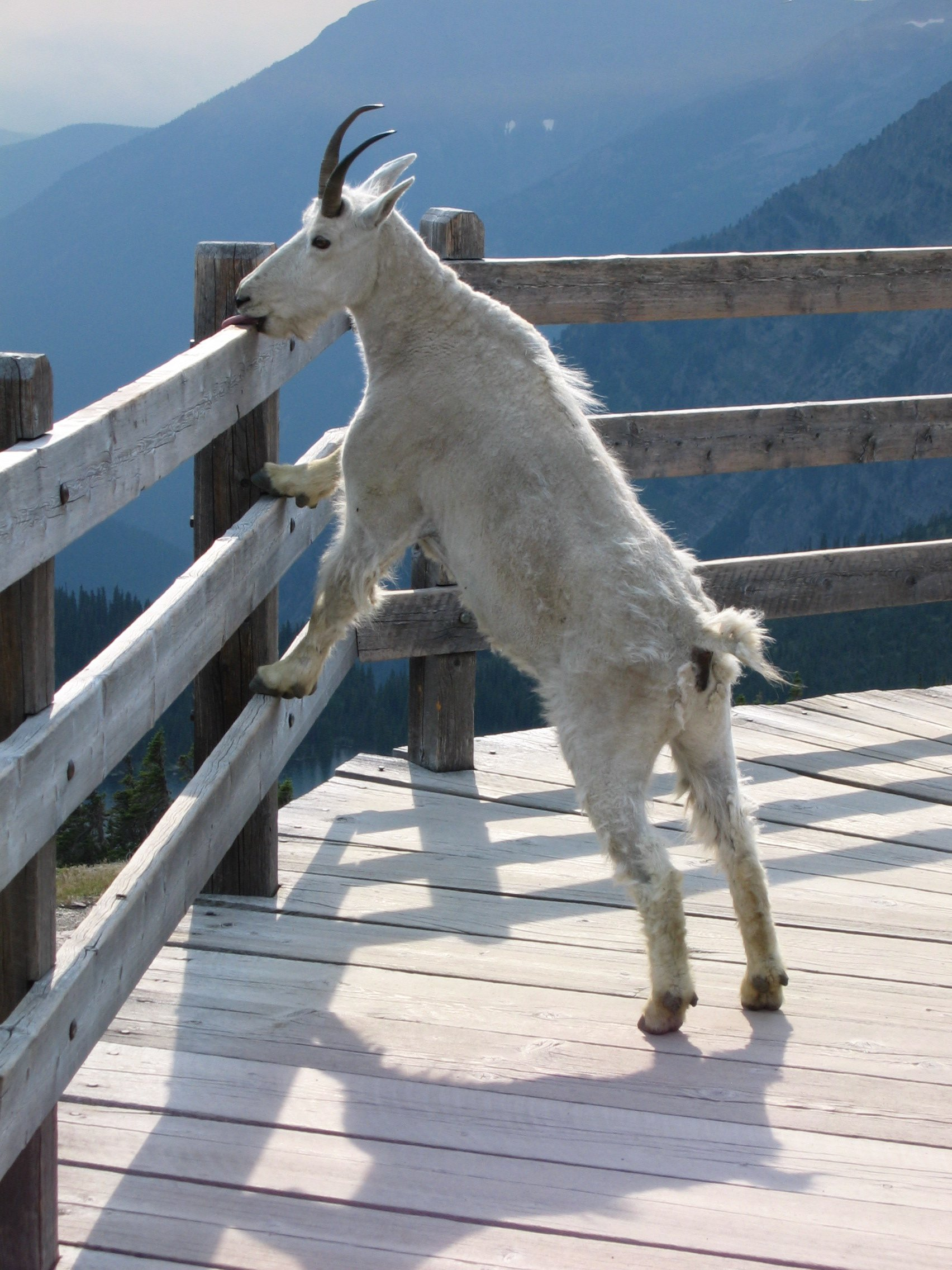
Young mountain goat licking handrail for salt

Mountain goats are herbivores and spend most of their time grazing. Their diets include grasses, herbs, sedges, ferns, mosses, lichens, and twigs and leaves from the low-growing shrubs and conifers of their high-altitude habitat.

In captivity, the mountain goat's diet can also include grain, alfalfa, fruits, vegetables and grass.

== Life cycle and mating ==
In the wild, mountain goats usually live 12 to 15 years, with their lifespans limited by the wearing down of their teeth. In zoos, however, they can live for 16-20 years.

kid, near Radium Hot Springs, BC, Canada

Mountain goats reach sexual maturity at about 30 months. Nannies in a herd undergo synchronized estrus in late October through early December, at which time females and males participate in a mating ritual. Mature billies stare at nannies for long periods, dig rutting pits, and fight each other in showy (though occasionally dangerous) scuffles. Nannies often ignore young billies, who try to participate but are discounted in favor of older partners. Both females and males usually mate with multiple individuals during breeding season, although some billies try to keep other males away from certain nannies. After the breeding season is over, females and males move away from each other. Nannies form loose-knit nursery groups of up to 50 animals. The adult billies leave, often alone or with two or three other billies.

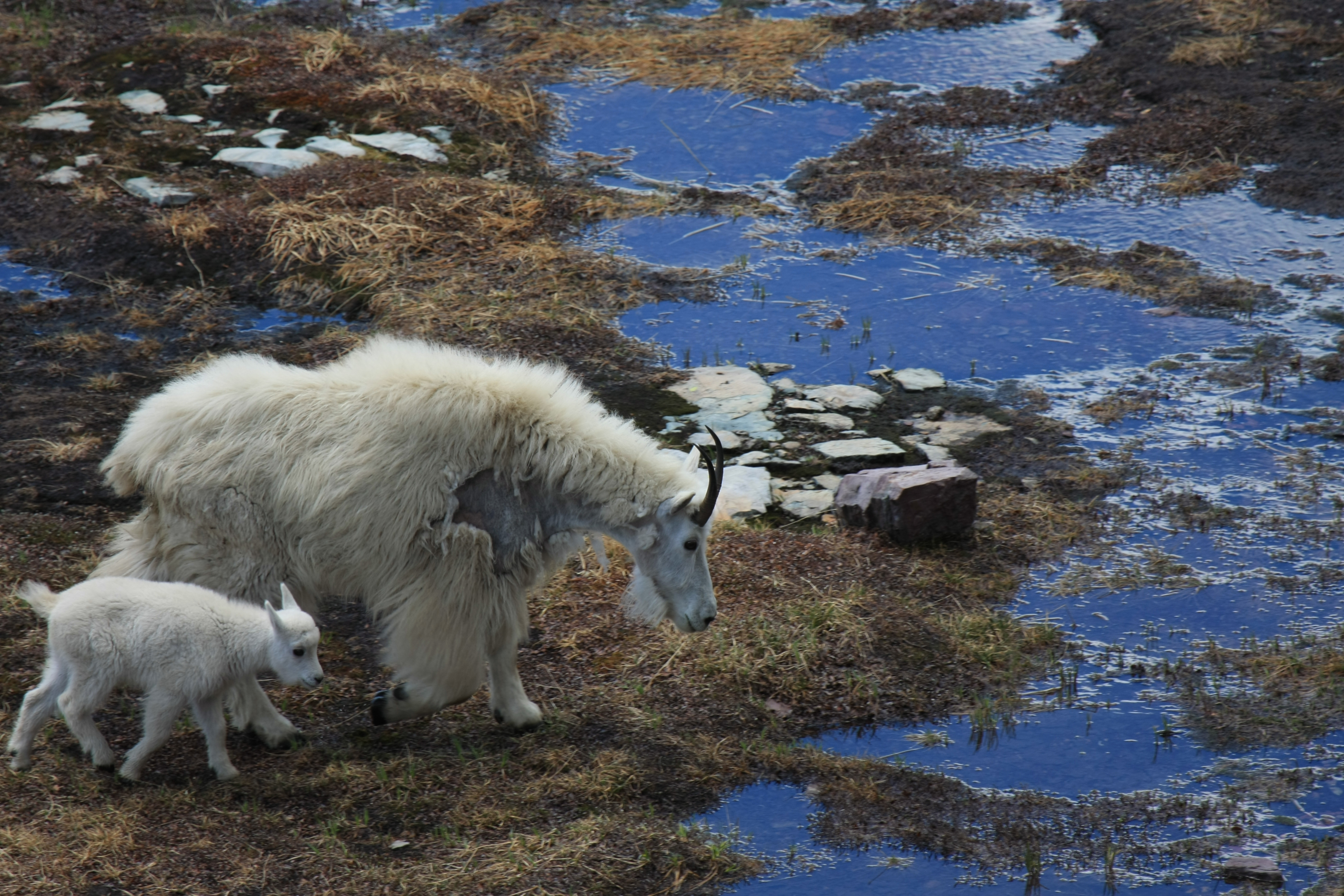
Mountain goat with kid in Glacier National Park

Kids are born in the spring (late May or early June) after a six-month gestation period. Nannies give birth, usually to a single offspring, after moving to an isolated ledge; post partum, they lick the kid dry and ingest the placenta. Kids weigh a little over 3 kg (6.6 lb) at birth and begin to run and climb (or attempt to do so) within hours. Although lactation is mostly finished at one month, kids follow their mothers closely for the first year of life (or until the nanny gives birth again, if this does not occur the next breeding season); nannies protect their young by leading them out of danger, standing over them when faced by predators, and positioning themselves below their kids on steep slopes to stop freefalls.

== Aggressive behavior ==
Nannies can be very competitive and protective of their space and food sources. They fight with one another for dominance in conflicts that can ultimately include all the nannies in the herd. In these battles, nannies circle each other with their heads lowered, displaying their horns. These conflicts can occasionally lead to injury or death, but are usually harmless. To avoid fighting, an animal may show a posture of nonaggression by stretching low to the ground.

In regions below the tree line, nannies use their fighting abilities to protect themselves and their offspring from predators. Predators, including wolves, wolverines, lynxes, and bears, attack goats of most ages given the opportunity. The cougar, or mountain lion, is perhaps the primary predator, being powerful enough to overwhelm the largest adults and uniquely nimble enough to navigate the rocky ecosystem of the goats. Though their size protects them from most potential predators in higher altitudes, nannies must sometimes defend their young from both bald and golden eagles, which can be a predatory threat to kids. Nannies have even been observed trying to dominate the more passive, but often heavier bighorn sheep that share some of their territory. In 2021, a mountain goat gored a grizzly bear to death in Yoho National Park, British Columbia.

Mountain goats introduced in the 1920s into Washington's Olympic Mountains were in time found to be a nuisance there, in particular while seeking human urine and sweat for its salt content, the park lacking natural salt licks, and even aggressively approaching human visitors. One such goat killed a hiker in 2010. Officials finally chose to eradicate them from the Olympic Peninsula, removing hundreds, mostly by capturing them and relocating them to the Cascade Mountains.

== Wool ==
Although mountain goats have never been domesticated and commercialized for their wool, pre-Columbian indigenous peoples of the Pacific Northwest Coast did incorporate their wool into their weaving by collecting spring moulted wool left by wild goats.

== Threats ==
Avalanches can constitute 23-65% of Alaskan mountain goat mortality depending on the region.
