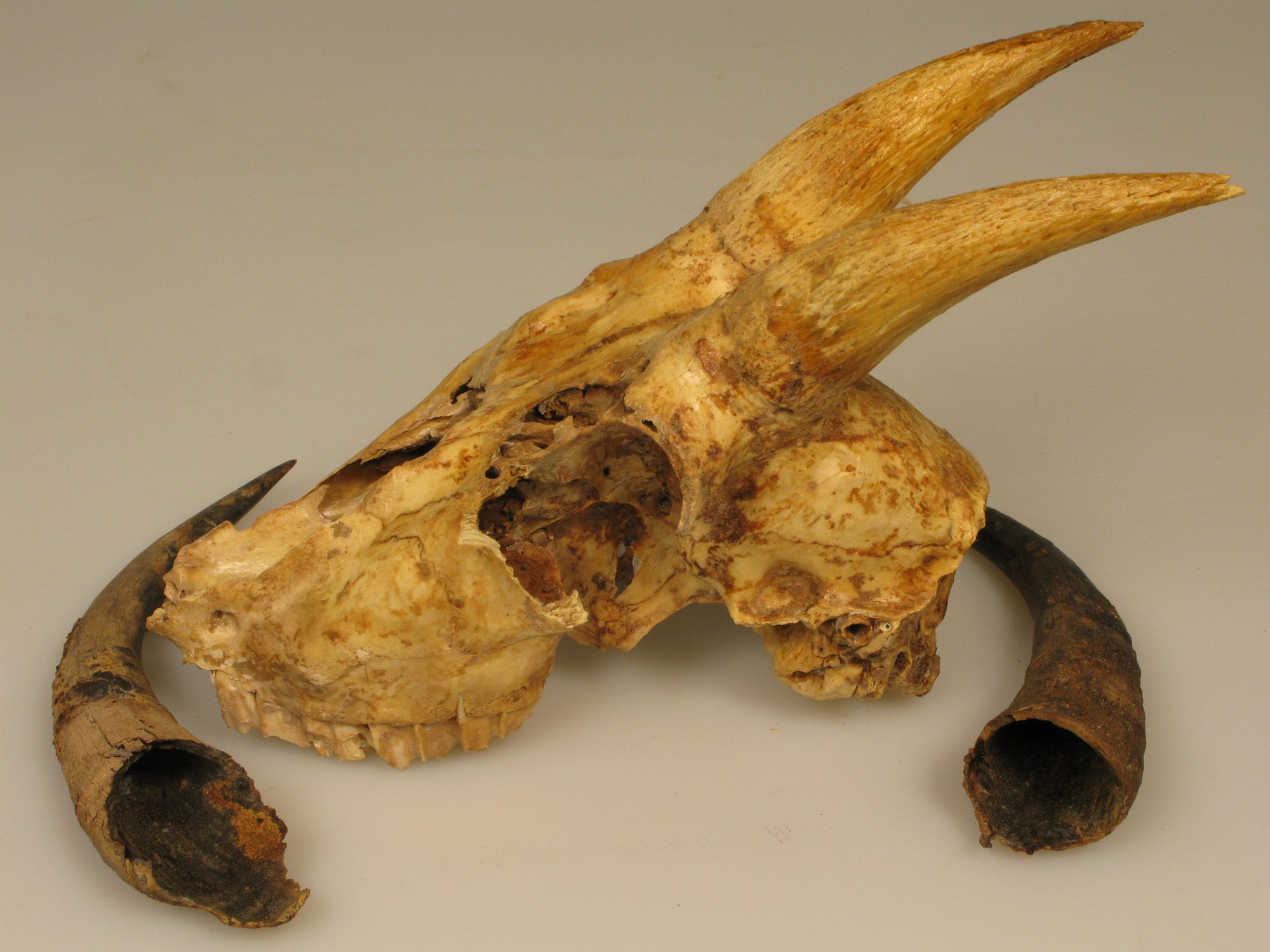
- Skull and horn sheaths of O. harringtoni

Scientific classification
- Kingdom: Animalia
- Phylum: Chordata
- Class: Mammalia
- Infraclass: Placentalia
- Order: Artiodactyla
- Family: Bovidae
- Subfamily: Caprinae
- Genus: Oreamnos
- Species: †O. harringtoni

Binomial name
- †Oreamnos harringtoni Stock, 1936

= Harrington's mountain goat =

Harrington's mountain goat Temporal range: 0.030–0.011 Ma

Extinct species of mammal

Harrington's mountain goat (Oreamnos harringtoni) was a species of caprine that resided in the Southwest of North America during the Pleistocene epoch. A relative of the modern mountain goat, which is the only extant species in the genus Oreamnos, O. harringtoni became extinct around 11,000 BC.

== Fossil record ==
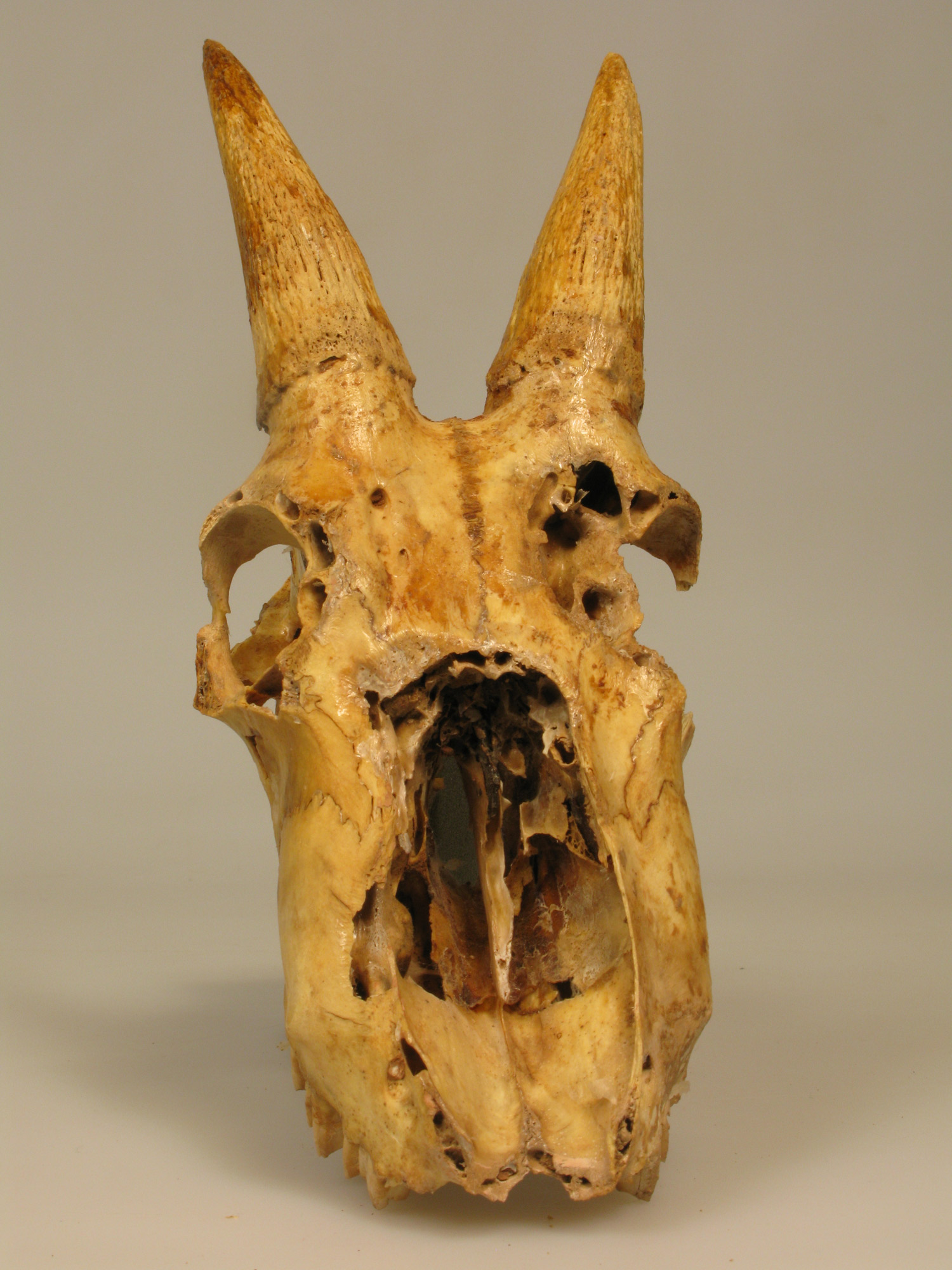
Frontal view of skull

Harrington's mountain goat was first described in the 1930s by paleontologist Chester Stock. Stock based his initial description on finds of skull fragments and metapodial bones from Smith Creek Cave in the Great Basin of Nevada. In 1937 he authored a Bulletin of the Southern California Academy of Sciences article titled "A new mountain goat from the Quaternary of Smith Creek Cave, Nevada". Later finds in Mexico, Colorado, Nevada, Utah, New Mexico, and the Grand Canyon have included intact skulls, metapodials, keratinous horn sheaths, dung, hair, muscle and ligament.

== Characteristics ==
Harrington's mountain goat was smaller than today's mountain goats, and had a longer, narrower face accompanied by thinner, smaller horns. Dung finds suggest that the goats frequented caves in the Grand Canyon during spring and possibly late winter and early summer. Their diet seems to have consisted of both grasses and browsing of conifers such as spruce, Douglas fir, limber pine, and water birch.

== Extinction ==
Harrington's mountain goat lived for at least 19,000 years prior to disappearing around 11,000 BC. The extinction is known to have coincided with the disappearance of at least 25 genera of land mammals, such as the Shasta ground sloth (Nothrotheriops shastensis), and the arrival of Native American hunters of the Clovis culture in the region.
