= Chubachu =

- District of Thimphu
- Country: Bhutan
- District: Thimphu District
- City: Thimphu

Chubachu is the central district of Thimphu, Bhutan. It is bounded by the Chubachu River to the north, the Wang Chu River to the east and Changangkha and Motithang to the west. The World Wide Fund for Nature (WWF) has its Bhutanese headquarters here; it has been responsible for facilitating tiger conservation in Bhutan. A weekend market is held on the western bank of the Wang Chu. To the west lies the Norzin Lam road which divides Chubachu from Motithang. This road contains the Bhutan Textile Museum and the National Library of Bhutan.The central road of the district is called Yanden Lam. The eastern road of the district is Chogyal Lam which runs northwest–southeast along the banks of the Wang Chu.
