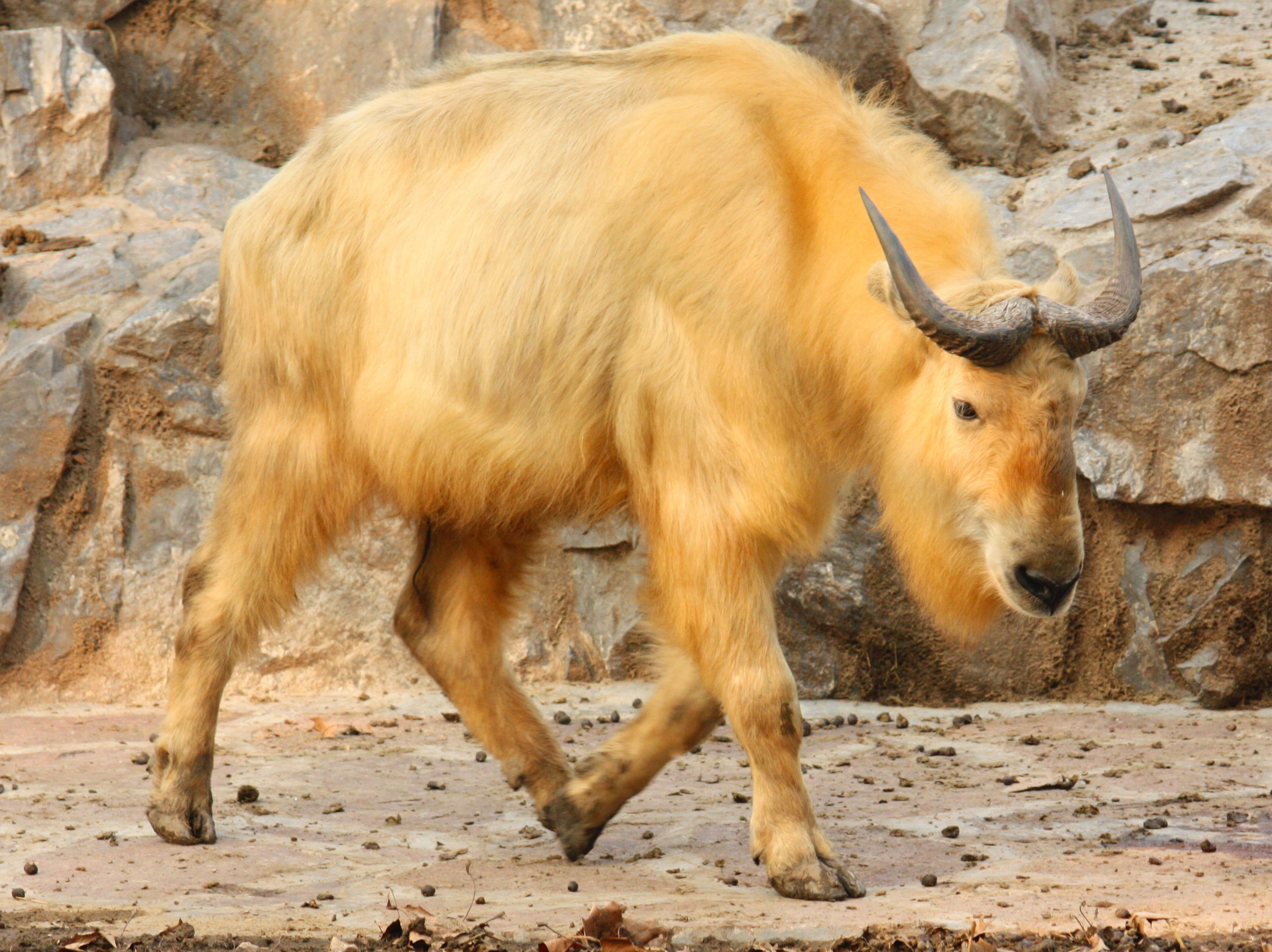
- A golden takin in the Shanghai Zoo

Conservation status
- Vulnerable (IUCN 2.3)

Scientific classification
- Kingdom: Animalia
- Phylum: Chordata
- Class: Mammalia
- Order: Artiodactyla
- Family: Bovidae
- Subfamily: Caprinae
- Genus: Budorcas
- Species: B. taxicolor
- Subspecies: B. t. bedfordi

Trinomial name
- Budorcas taxicolor bedfordi Thomas, 1911

= Golden takin =

Endangered goat-antelope

The golden takin (Budorcas taxicolor bedfordi) is a threatened subspecies of takin, native to the Qin Mountains in the south of China's Shaanxi province.

== Description ==
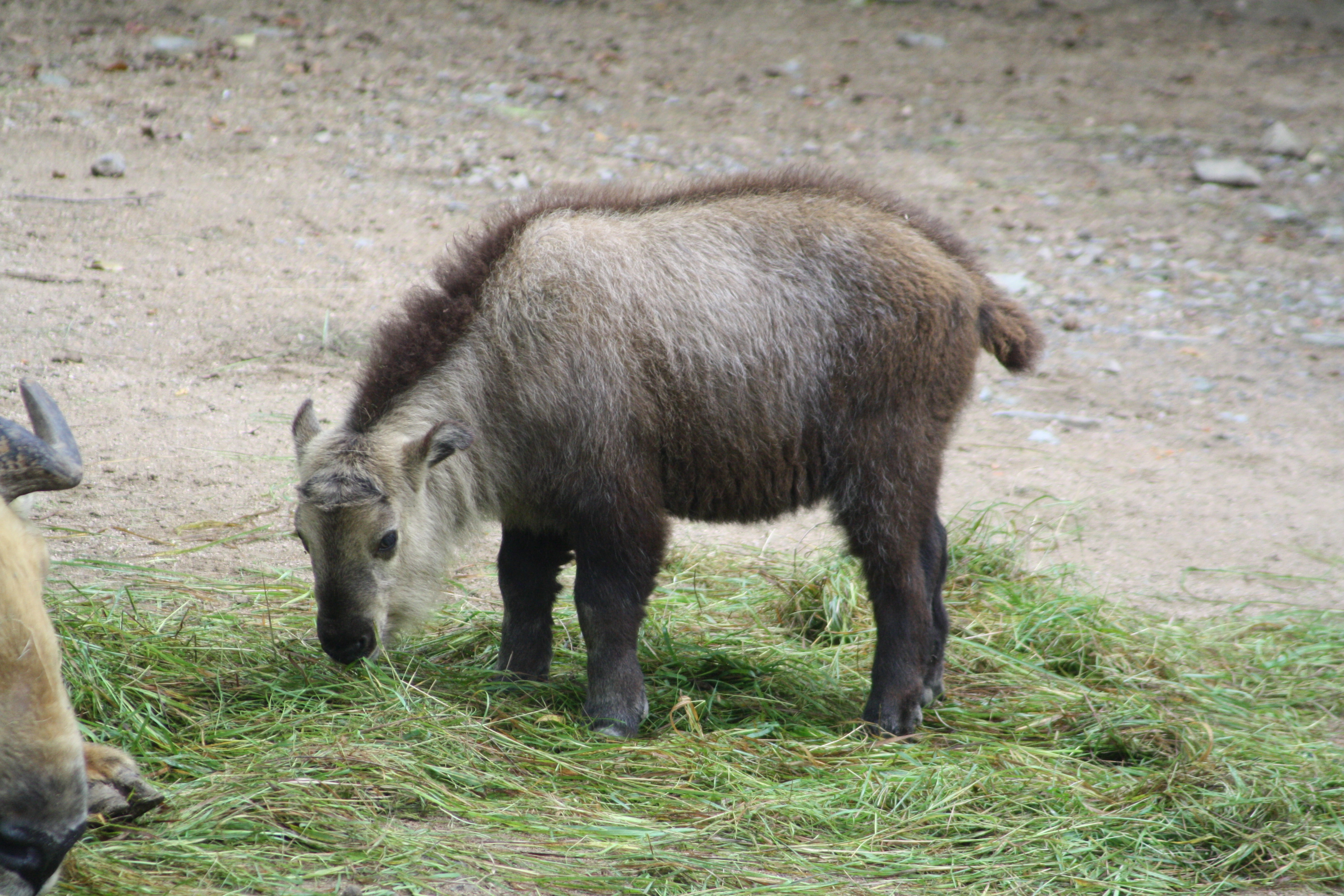
A takin calf

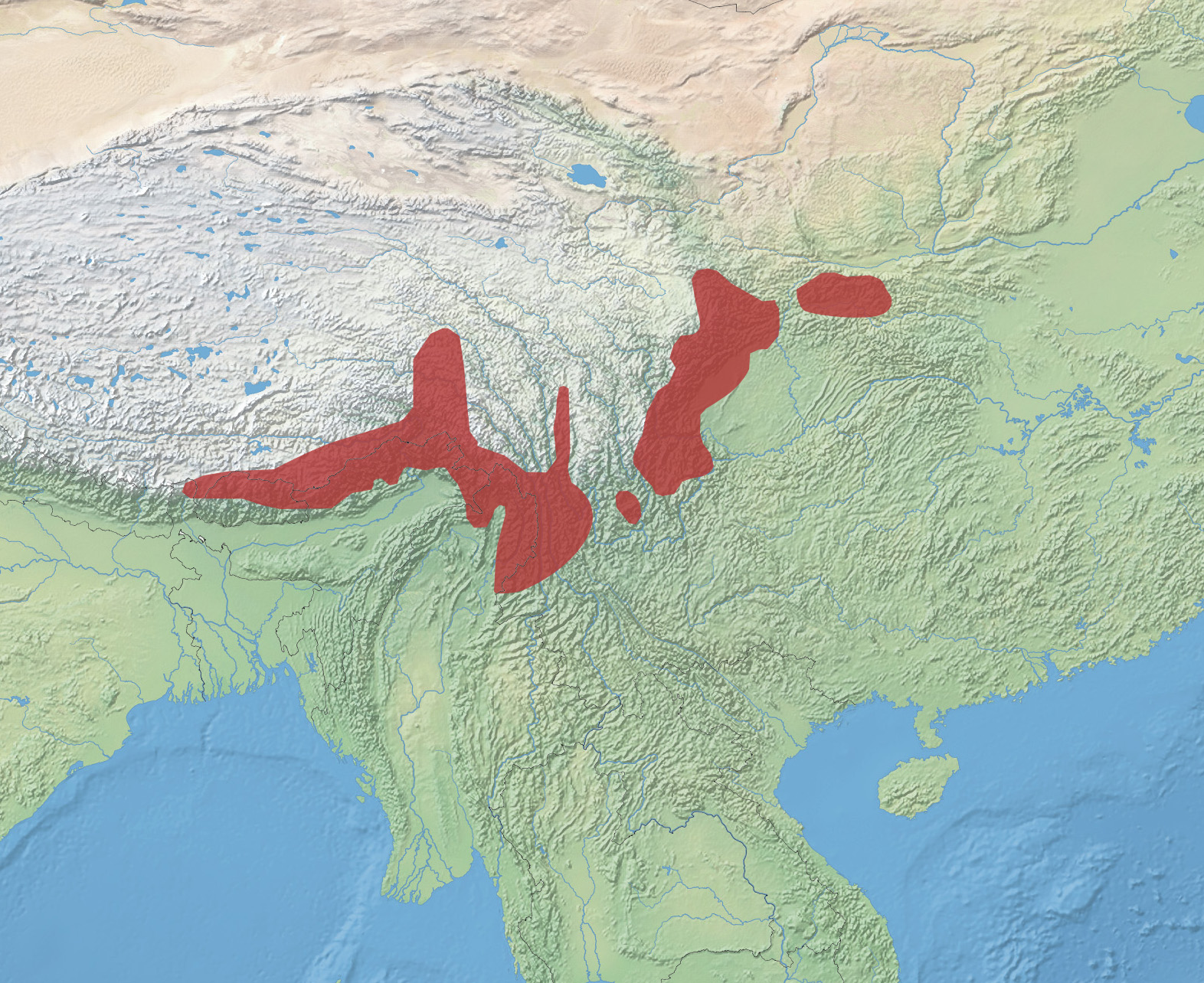
Natural range of takins

Golden takins are identified by their distinctive golden coats and are classified as vulnerable due to habitat loss and poaching. They possess thick coats which contain oils that keep them insulated and prevents heat loss.

The fur of the golden takin is white or off-white. In adult males, fur on the neck and fore chest is golden. The horns, hooves, and hairless areas of the nostrils are black. The ears are short, narrow, and pointed; the tail is short, triangular, and hairless on the underside. Calves are easily identified by their smaller body size and brown-gray coat, as well as a dark-brown line of longer fur that extends from the base of their head to their tail. The horns of the calf do not appear until it is six months old.

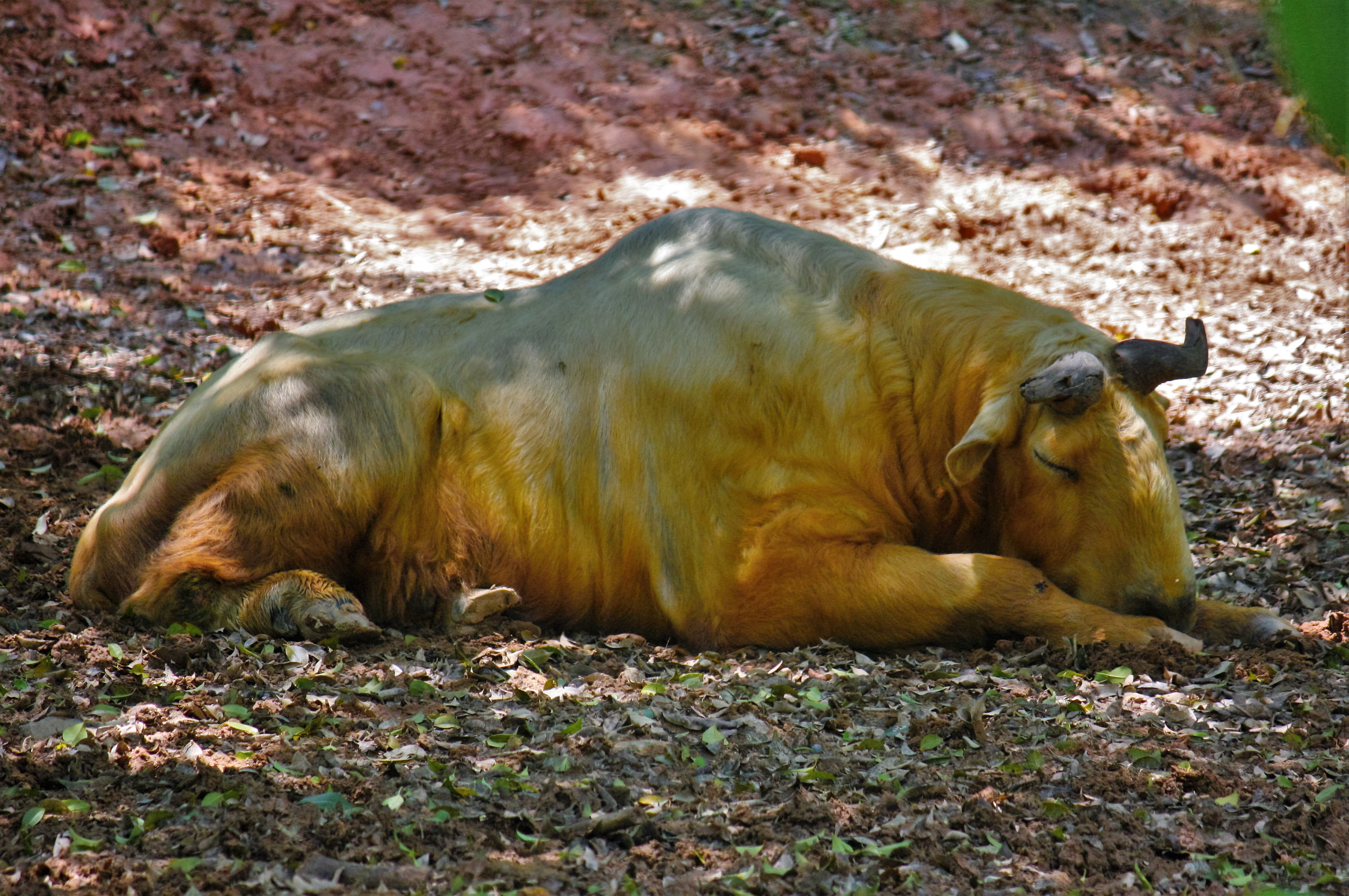
A takin asleep

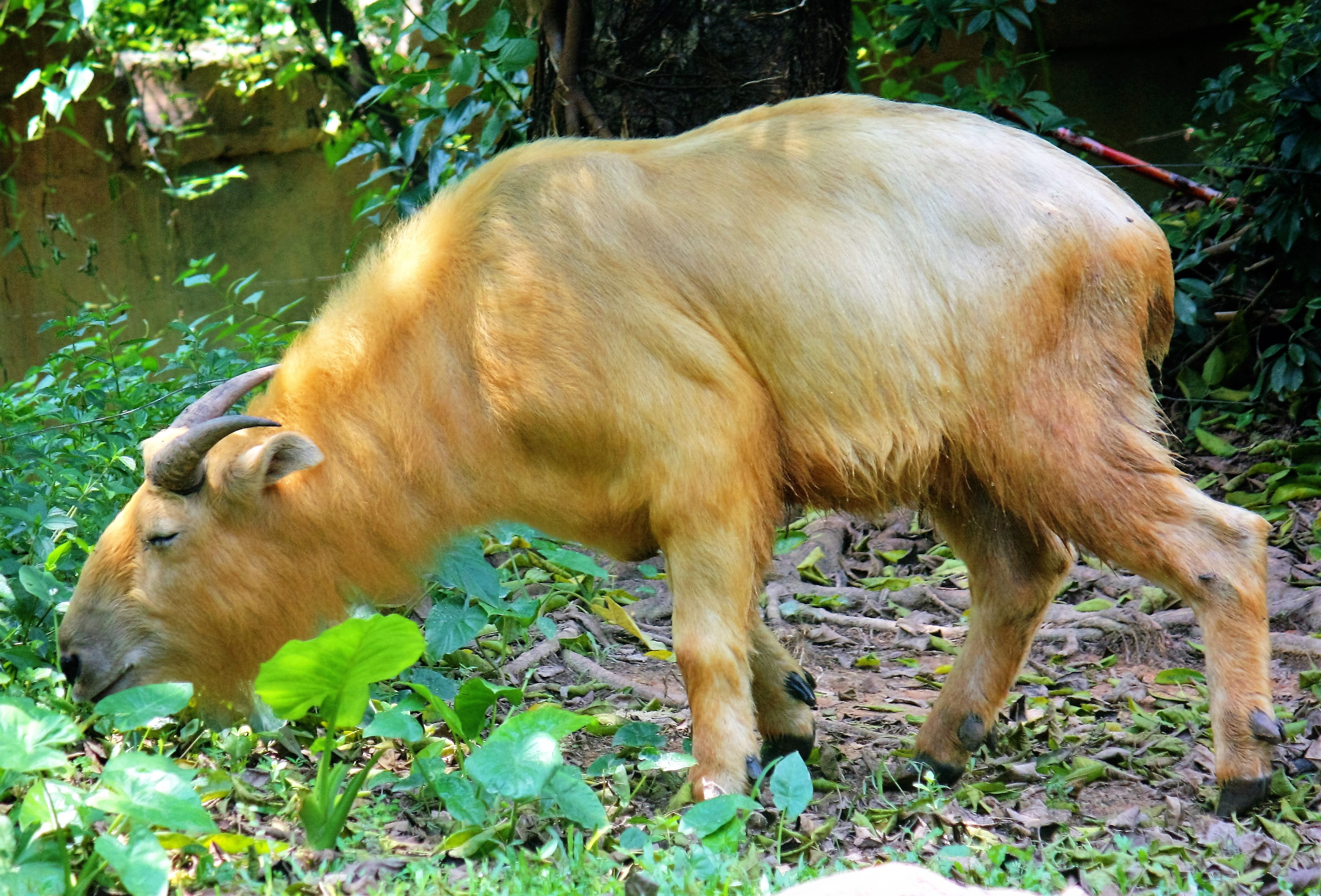
A takin eating

Takins also use pheromones in their urine to communicate sexual status and identity. Males spray their own forelegs, chest, and face with urine, and females soak their tails when urinating.

Since it is illegal to hunt and capture golden takins, researchers study the takin via non-invasive methods, such as fecal collection. The fecal microbiota of golden takins is likely influenced by the seasons and animals' sex, with the highest diversity occurring in spring, coinciding with their migrations.

Higher concentrations of certain elements, such as arsenic, cobalt, copper, and selenium, have been detected in captive-bred specimens, with contaminated food being the main source of element exposure. Most levels were within safe ranges, with arsenic and lead being an exception.

== Habitat ==
While takins are generally found throughout mountainous areas of China, Burma, India and Bhutan, golden takins are confined to the Qinling Mountains in Shaanxi Province of China. They inhabit forests at elevations ranging from 1,200 to 3,500 m (3,900 to 11,500 feet), making them especially sensitive to deforestation and hunting.

Golden takins gather in large herds each spring and migrate up the mountains to the tree line, at an altitude above 4,300 m (14,000 feet). As cooler weather approaches and food becomes scarce, they move down to forested valleys. Golden takins use the same routes during movement throughout the mountains despite where they are going; creating a series of well-worn paths through the dense growths of bamboo and rhododendrons that lead to their natural salt licks and grazing areas.

== Herds ==
Herd sizes change with the seasons: during spring and early summer, herds can number up to 300 animals; during cooler months, when food is less plentiful, the large herds break up into smaller groups of 10 to 35 golden takins as they head up the mountain. Herds are made up of adult females, juveniles, subadults, and young males. Older males are generally solitary, except during the mating season in late summer. Group sizes are highly variable, influenced, among other things, by subadults gradually breaking off contact with their mother in the course of maturing. Human disturbance is also speculated to be an influential factor, as takins who are disturbed by humans often run in different directions, splitting the group.

Normally solitary, bull takins meet up with herds for a short time during the rut. Male bulls bellow loudly to attract cows and notify other bulls of their presence. They may find cows by tracking their scent. Once they meet, a bull sniffs and licks the female to determine if she is receptive.

Takin cows seek out areas of dense vegetation to give birth in early spring, usually to a single calf, though twin births have been observed in rare cases. If a young takin is separated from its mother, it lets out a noise to alarm the mother, and the mother answers with a low, guttural call that allows for them to reunite. A takin kid eats solid food and stops nursing at around two months old, although it may continue to stay near its mother until after her next calf is born. Horns begin to grow when the takin kid is about six months old. At birth, takin kids are much darker than adults, which acts as camouflage, helping to protect them from predators; the dark stripe along their back disappears and their coat gets lighter in color, longer, and shaggier as they get older.
