= Hotel Motithang =

Hotel in Thimphu, Bhutan

- Interactive map of the Hotel Motithang area

General information
- Location: Motithang, Thimphu, Bhutan
- Coordinates: 27°28′30″N 89°37′11″E
- Opening: 1974; 52 years ago

Other information
- Number of rooms: 14
- Number of restaurants: 1

Hotel Motithang is a hotel in Thimphu, Bhutan. It was established in 1974 on the occasion of the coronation of Jigme Singye Wangchuck. At the time, the hotel was located in the middle of forest, separated from the city by farmland but today this area has grown up with houses and gardens. It has 14 rooms and a restaurant which serves up to 30 people, serving Bhutanese. Indian and continental cuisine.
