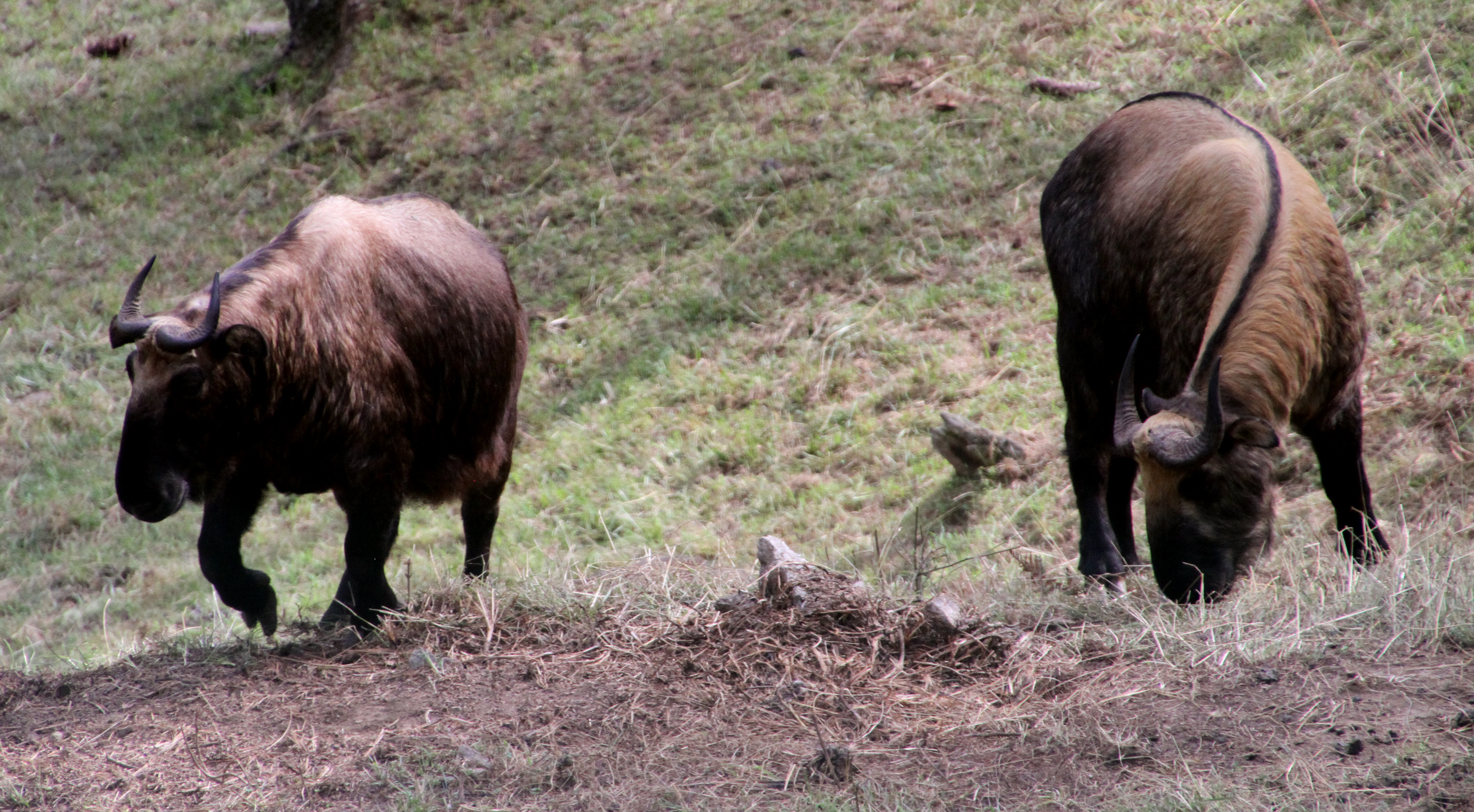
- Takin at Motithang Takin Preserve, Bhutan

Conservation status
- Vulnerable (IUCN 3.1)
- CITES Appendix II

Scientific classification
- Kingdom: Animalia
- Phylum: Chordata
- Class: Mammalia
- Order: Artiodactyla
- Family: Bovidae
- Subfamily: Caprinae
- Genus: Budorcas
- Species: B. taxicolor

Binomial name
- Budorcas taxicolor Hodgson, 1850

Subspecies
- B. t. bedfordi B. t. taxicolor B. t. whitei
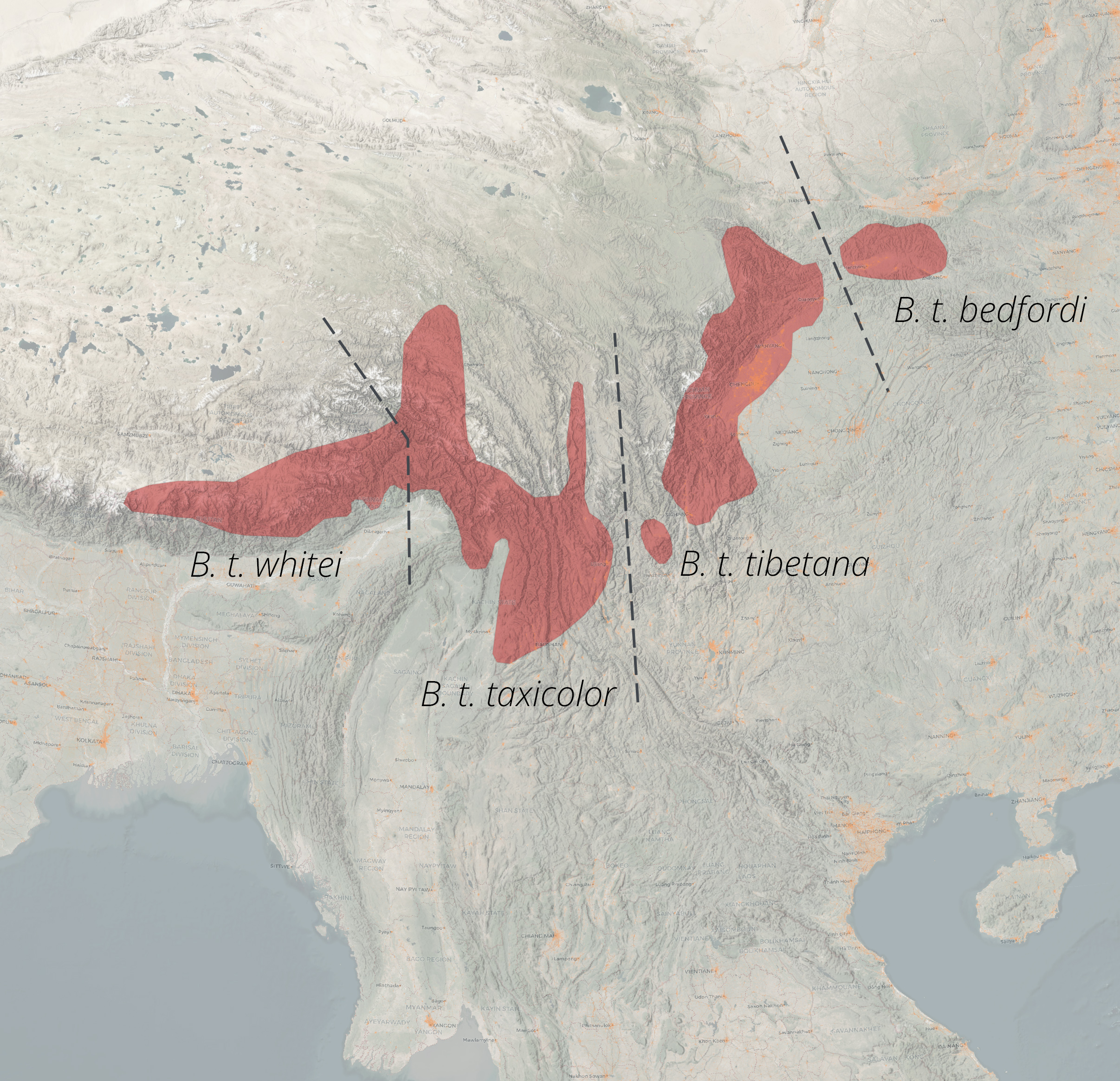
- Distribution of the takin

= Takin =

Species of mammal

The takin (Budorcas taxicolor); /ˈtɑːkɪn/ is a large species of ungulate of the subfamily Caprinae found in the eastern Himalayas. It includes three subspecies, the Mishmi takin (B. t. taxicolor), the golden takin (B. t. bedfordi), and the Bhutan takin (B. t. whitei), and is closely related to the Tibetan (or Sichuan) takin (B. tibetana).

Whilst the takin has in the past been placed together with the muskox in the tribe Ovibovini, more recent mitochondrial research shows a closer relationship to Ovis (sheep). Its physical similarity to the muskox is therefore an example of convergent evolution.

The takin is the national animal of Bhutan.

== Etymology ==
The genus name Budorcas comes from Ancient Greek: βοῦς, romanized: bous, lit. 'ox, cow' and δορκάς, dorkas, 'gazelle'. The specific name taxicolor comes from Latin: taxus, lit. 'badger' and color, 'hue' referring to badger-like colour.

== Description ==
The takin has a stocky body and a deep chest. Its large head is distinctive by its long, arched nose and stout horns, which are ridged at the base. Horns are present in both sexes and run parallel to the skull before turning upwards to a short point; they are about 30 cm (12 in) long, but can grow up to 64 cm (25 in). Its long, shaggy coat is light in colour with a dark stripe along the back, and bulls also have dark faces. Hair length can range from 3 cm (1.2 in) on the flanks of the body in summer to 24 cm (9.4 in) on the underside of the head in winter. Its short legs are supported by large, two-toed hooves, which each have a highly developed spur. It is among the largest and stockiest of the subfamily Caprinae.

In height, takin stand 97 to 140 cm (38 to 55 in) at the shoulder, but measure a relatively short 160–220 cm (63–87 in) in head-and-body length, with the tail adding only an additional 12 to 21.6 cm (4.7 to 8.5 in). Its weights varies, but according to most reports, bulls are slightly larger, with 300–350 kg (660–770 lb) against 250–300 kg (550–660 lb) in females. The largest captive takin weighed 322 kg (710 lb).

The takin secretes an oily, strong-smelling substance over its whole body, enabling it to mark objects such as trees. A prominent nose with a swollen appearance caused biologist George Schaller to liken the takin to a "bee-stung moose". Features reminiscent of other familiar horned animals have earned takins such nicknames as "cattle chamois" and "gnu goat".

== Distribution and habitat ==
Takin are found from forested valleys to rocky, grass-covered alpine zones, at altitudes between 1,000 and 4,500 m (3,300 and 14,800 ft) above sea level. The Mishmi takin occurs in eastern Arunachal Pradesh, while the Bhutan takin is in western Arunachal Pradesh and Bhutan. Dihang-Dibang Biosphere Reserve in Arunachal Pradesh, India is a stronghold of both Mishmi, Upper Siang (Kopu) and Bhutan takins.

== Behaviour and ecology ==
Video of a takin scent-rubbing in Yokohama Zoo

Takin are found in small family groups of around 20 individuals, although older males may lead a more solitary existence. In the summer, herds of up to 300 individuals gather high on the mountain slopes. Groups often appear to occur in largest numbers where favourable feeding sites, salt licks, or hot springs are located. Mating takes place in July and August. Adult males compete for dominance by sparring head-to-head with opponents, and both sexes appear to use the scent of their own urine to indicate dominance. A single young is born after a gestation period of around eight months. Takin migrate from the upper pasture to lower, more forested areas in winter and favour sunny spots upon sunrise. When disturbed, individuals give a 'cough' alarm call and the herd retreats into thick bamboo thickets and lies on the ground for camouflage.

Takin feed in the early morning and late afternoon, grazing on a variety of leaves and grasses, as well as bamboo shoots and flowers. They have been observed standing on their hind legs to feed on leaves over 3.1 m (10 ft) high. Salt is also an important part of their diets, and groups may stay at a mineral deposit for several days.

== Threats ==
The takin is listed as Vulnerable on the IUCN Red List and considered Endangered in China. It is threatened by overhunting and the destruction of its natural habitat. It is not a common species naturally, and the population appears to have been reduced considerably. Takin horns have appeared in the illegal wildlife trade in Myanmar; during three surveys carried out from 1999 to 2006 in the Tachilek market, a total of 89 sets of horns were observed openly for sale.

== Taxonomy ==
Relationships with other caprines based on mitochondrial DNA:

- - Bos
  - Caprini
    - Pantholops
    - - - - †Bootherium (Helmeted muskox)
          - Ovibos (Musk ox)
        - - Capricornis (Serow)
          - Naemorhedus (Goral)
      - - - Ovis (Sheep)
        - - - - - Oreamnos (Mountain goat)
              - - - Budorcas (Takin)
                - - - †Myotragus (Balearic islands goat)
            - - - Rupicapra (Chamois)
          - - - Ammotragus (Barbary sheep)
              - Arabitragus (Arabian tahr)
            - - - Pseudois (Bharal)
              - - Hemitragus (Himalayan tahr)
                - Capra (Markhor, ibexes, goats)

In 2022, researchers found that the takin likely represents two species, the Himalayan takin (B. taxicolor) and the Chinese takin (B. tibetana).
