= Motithang Higher Secondary School =

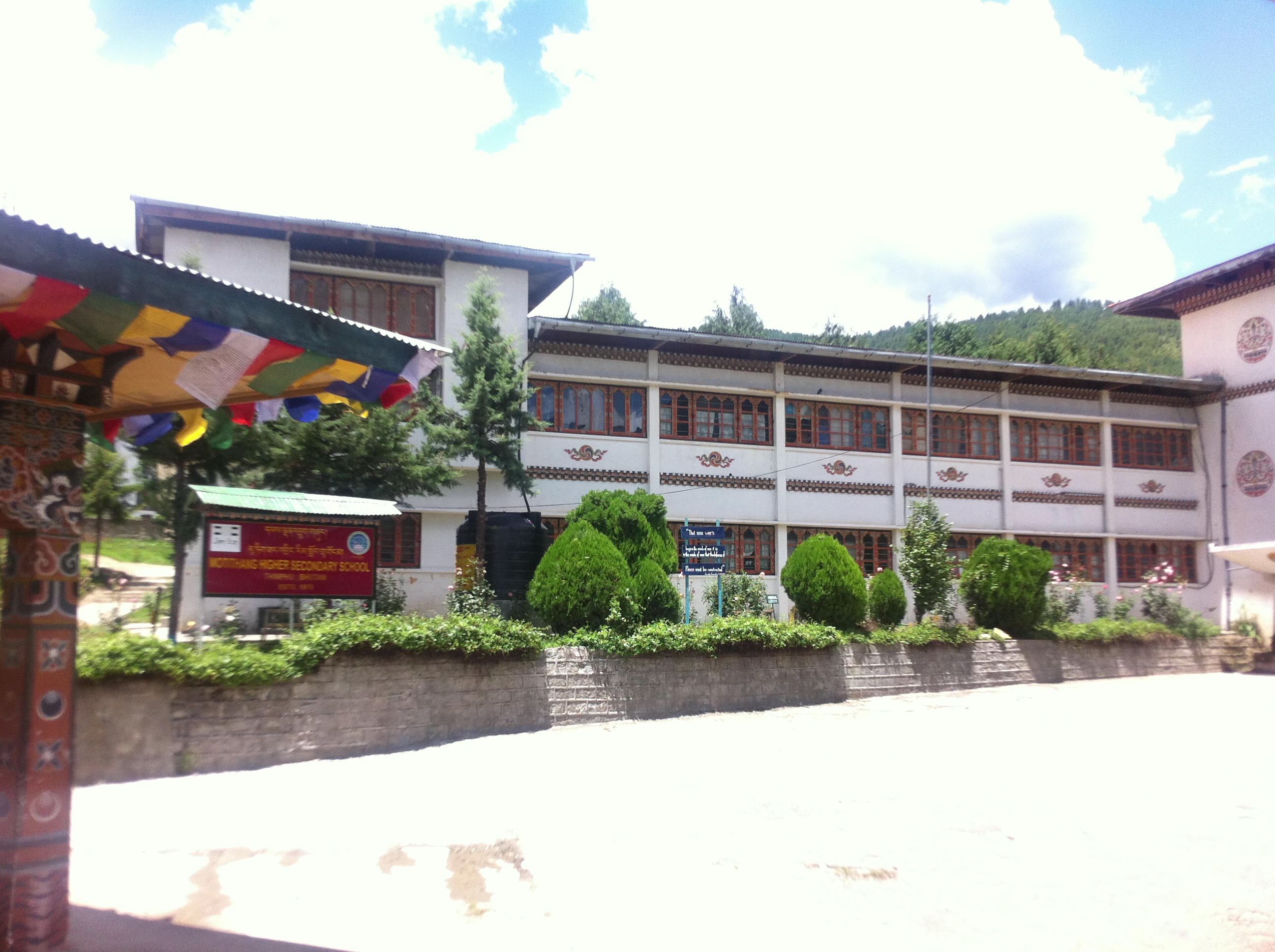
- The main academic building

Location
- Thori Lam, Motithang; Bhutan
- 27.474993°N 89.623130°E

Information
- Type: Government School
- Motto: Inculcate the GNH values to students. Mold the mind of youth to attain GNH goal.
- Religious affiliation: Buddhist
- Established: April 1, 1975; 51 years ago
- School district: Thimphu
- Principal: Jigme Choden
- Faculty: 70 (approx.)
- Enrollment: 1100 (approx.)
- Campus type: Suburban

Motithang Higher Secondary School (Dzongkha: མུ་ཏིག་ཐང་འབྲིང་རིམ་སློབ་གྲྭ་གོང་མ) is a government high school in the capital city of Thimphu, Bhutan. It was established in the year 1975. Motithang translates to The Meadow of Pearls in English.

Mr Aparesh Dhar was the first principal of the school (formerly known as Motithang Central School).

== Location ==
It is located 1 mile north of the main city, in Motithang. The school shares its border with Jigme Namgyel lower secondary school.

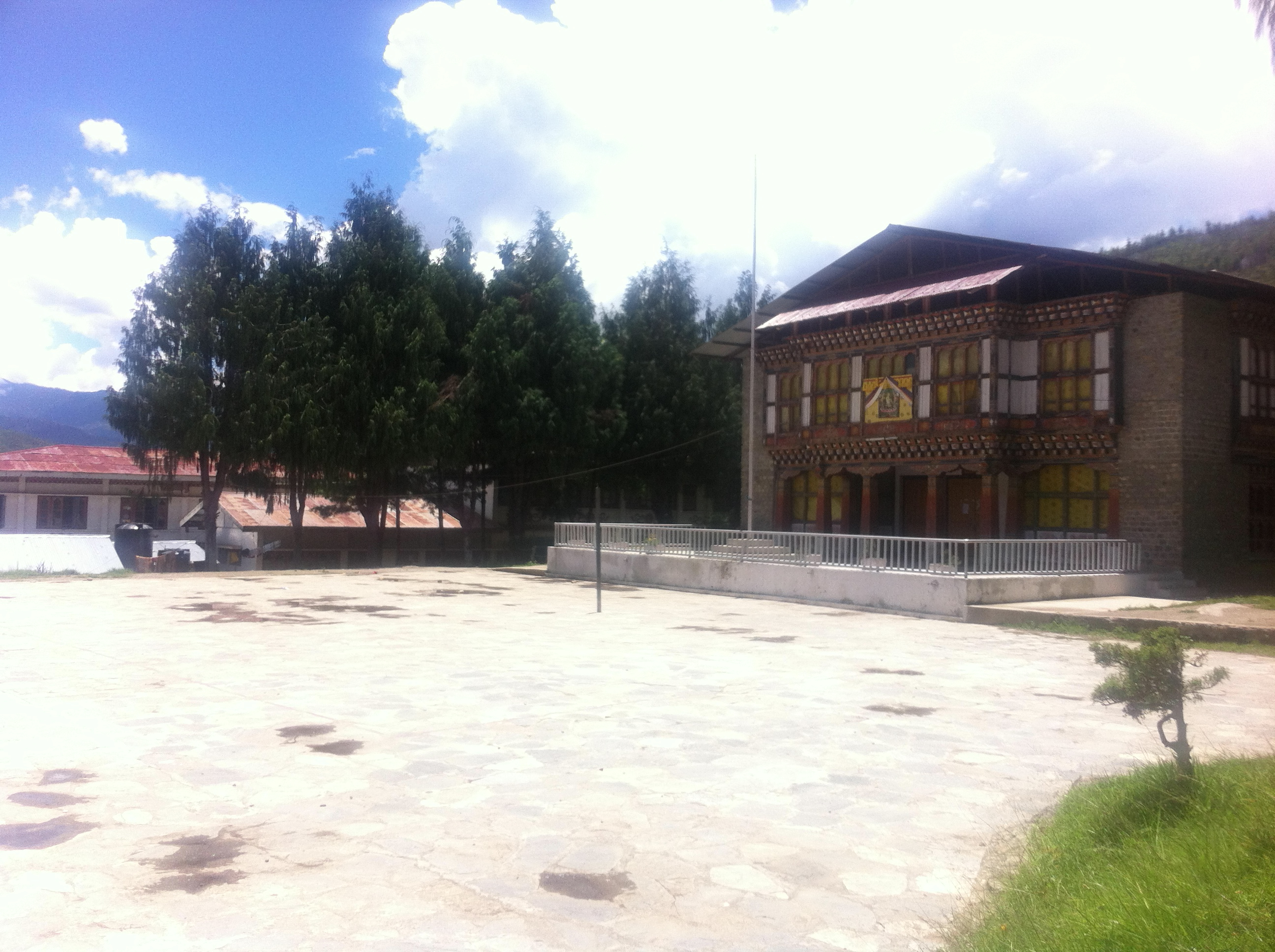
The Assembly Ground

== Academic Session ==
For all the government school in Bhutan, the academic year is February–December. The two weeks summer break commences from first day of July.

== Houses ==
The school named each of their houses after the current King of Bhutan, His Majesty Jigme Khesar Namgyel Wangchuck as a mark of utmost respect. They are:

1. Druk House
2. Gyalpo House
3. Jigme House
4. Khesar House
5. Namgyel House
6. Wangchuck House

Each house is being led by a house master and a house mistress and a group of teachers. A total of four student representatives are being elected to work in the house administration. A boy and a girl vice captain are selected yearly from the eleventh graders and then promoted to full house captains in the following year.

== Education ==
The subjects for the ninth and tenth grader include mathematics, English, Dzongkha, physics, chemistry, biology, computer science, economics, history and geography. The medium of instruction is English for all subjects except for the Dzongkha course. Entrance to the eleventh and twelfth grades would require an individual to obtain higher marks than the required baseline i.e. the cut-off percentage for entering into government high school.

The courses for the eleventh and twelfth grader are divided into three major streams. They are:

- Science

Courses in this field include English, Dzongkha, physics, chemistry, computer science (only for Information technology students) and mathematics/biology as a choice.

- Commerce

Courses in this field include English, Dzongkha, commerce, accountancy, business-mathematics and economics/computer science as a choice.

- Arts and Humanities

Courses in this field include English, Dzongkha, history, geography and Rigzhung. English literature/business mathematics and economics/computer science stands as a choice.

== Faculty ==
The school is now headed by Madam Jigme Choden, the principal of Changzamtog Lower Secondary School earlier. The vice principal for the school is Mrs.Tshering Zam and the school is run by a faculty of 70 staffs. The faculty consists of fourteen non-teaching staffs (approx.) helping in the school's management.

== Student Body – Student Representative Council ==
The Council consists of two presidents, two vice presidents, the general captains and PYP (Police Youth Partnership) volunteers. The student council serves as an important consultative body in the school's management, helping the school in matters concerning the students. This body serves as an important link between the students and the teachers of the school.

== Achievements ==
The Ministry of Education has also introduced a new system to rank schools in Bhutan called the Performance Management System (PMS). This system uses three criterion (practices, GNH and academic) to determine whether a school performing to the expected level or not. At the Annual Education Conference held in December 2010 at Phuntsholing, Motithang higher secondary school was ranked the third well performing school.

Students of grade ten and twelve in Bhutan have to sit for the examination conducted by Bhutan Council for School Examination and Assessment (BCSEA). In the BCSE and BHSEC standardized test set by the council for class ten and twelve respectively, many of the students from the school had made it to the top of the examination.

- 2007

Mr. Bhuwan Giri (88.75%), a science students topped the BHSEC examination. Mr. Tshering Penjore (92.40%) and Ms. Gitanjali Lamichaney (89.40%) took the second and third place in the BCSE examination.

- 2008

Ms. Chimmi Dema (91.60%) took the third position in the 2008 BCSE, class 10 examination.

- 2009

Mr. Yeshey Samdrup (90%) of science stream topped the BHSEC examination.

- 2010

Ms. Tshering Dolkar (87.5%) and Ms. Kesang Yuden (87.25%) from arts stream and Mr. Tandin Dorji (86.5%) from science stream took the first, second and third place respectively in BHSEC examination.

- 2012

Mr. Sonam Tsheten (87.75%) from arts stream took the third place in the BHSEC examination. Ms. Karma Choden (85.50%) took the first position in the Commerce stream category in BHSEC examination. Ms. Sonam Tshomo (94%) and Ms. Divya Chhetri took a tie at the third place in BCSE Examination.

- 2013

Ms. Deki Tshomo Rinzin (92%) took the second position in BCSE Examination.

- 2014

Ms. Dorji Wangmo (93%) topped the country in the BCSE Examination. Ms Sonam Tshomo (89%) from arts stream took the first place in the BHSEC examination.

- 2016

Ms. Ugyen Lhamo (86%) took the second position in the country from science stream in BHSEC examination.
