= Corruption in Bhutan =

Corruption in Bhutan is considered relatively low. The small kingdom is noted for its Gross National Happiness index. The record of corruption in the country is also relatively low and the kingdom is the least corrupt country in the South Asian region. A low incidence of corruption still exists and the government has instituted reforms and initiatives to address them.

== Background ==
There is a culture of public service in Bhutan where civil servants prioritize serving the state and the king. This commitment to duty has so far deterred the emergence of a culture of corruption in the kingdom. This is demonstrated in the case of the Royal Civil Service Commission (RCSC), which oversees the recruitment of government personnel. It was established through the interconnection of three main entities: the king, the commission, and the civil service law. These created a merit-based civil service that has a clear set of rules and regulations for recruitment and human resource development.

RCSC is also mandated to maintain and implement general policies designed to promote efficiency, loyalty, integrity, and a high level of morale among civil servants. The efficient civil service system is governed by the king's concept of the bureaucracy as “small, efficient and effective government that is clean and not corrupt whose members are well paid, well looked after and disciplined.”

Anti-corruption mechanisms include the Anti-Corruption Commission (ACC), which is the kingdom's lead agency in preventing and addressing incidences of corruption. The ACC, which was established through the Anti-Corruption Act of Bhutan 2011, prosecutes corruption cases and promotes integrity and accountability. The agency also has the authority to carry out preventive measures and educational initiatives designed to increase awareness about corruption. It maintains its own complaints and management system and adopts relevant conventions such as the Debarment Rule 2023.

The agency is central to Bhutan's long-term anti-corruption goal as outlined in its Strategic Anti-Corruption Roadmap 2021–2030. This roadmap has an operational framework in the form of the agency called National Integrity and Anti-Corruption Strategy (NIACS).

Bhutan's anti-corruption record has earned recognition. For instance, many aspects of the country's scheme for criminalization of bribery meet international standards.

== Corruption issues ==
Key corruption challenges in Bhutan include favoritism in the civil service as well as corruption and unethical practices in the areas of public procurement and financial transactions. Favoritism in the civil service is associated with the patron-client relationships that still persist in the formal aspects of politics in the country. A criticism claims that the royal family members are the kingdom's largest landowners and have controlling interests in several companies. It is said that this allows the monarchy to use its wealth to control the political game.

A study by the ACC also found that Bhutanese people do not feel strongly against corruption. There is tolerance for bribes and nepotism among government officials and this is attributed to a culture of unquestioning respect for superiors and also due to Buddhist beliefs, which include the idea that individuals will eventually reap their own karma. This cultural aspect has bearing on the number of cases reported due to the acceptance that “there is no person without faults”. Buddhism has also no strong concept of revenge or punishment. These factors are being addressed by the government's efforts to raise public awareness on corrupt practices.

According to the country's Anti-Corruption Commission, there were 435 corruption cases from 2021 to 2022. These cases, which had an average of 36 per month, included reports of embezzlement, bribery, and false claims. Part of these cases involved the investigation and prosecution of Phuentsholing Mini Dry Port (MDP), which was accused of bribery and other illegal activities connected with their import of essential goods. This case involved public officials as well as private individuals and entities. The efficiency of the government in prosecuting these cases is underscored by an 88.62 percent conviction rate. During the previous fiscal year period (2020–2021), the average number of cases report was 25 per month. It is claimed that the uptick in reported cases is the result of increased awareness, trust and confidence in the government's anti-corruption initiatives. During the 2022-2023 period, there were 342 corruption cases reported and a 75 percent conviction rate.

From complaint-based investigations, the ACC has shifted towards research and intelligence-based investigations, which feature a capability for strategic prioritization of high-risk and high-impact corruption cases.

== International ranking ==
Bhutan ranked 18th out of the 182 countries listed in Transparency International's 2025 Corruption Perceptions Index, where the country ranked first is perceived to have the most honest public sector. Bhutan's 2024 score of 72 and 2025 score of 71, on a scale from 0 ("highly corrupt") to 100 ("very clean"), are an improvement over the previous score of 68, which Bhutan held from 2018 to 2023. For comparison with regional scores, the best score among those countries of the Asia Pacific region that appeared in the Index (Note: Afghanistan, Australia, Bangladesh, Bhutan, Brunei Darussalam, Cambodia, China, Fiji, Hong Kong, India, Indonesia, Japan, North Korea, South Korea, Laos, Malaysia, Maldives, Mongolia, Myanmar, Nepal, New Zealand, Pakistan, Papua New Guinea, Philippines, Singapore, Solomon Islands, Sri Lanka, Taiwan, Thailand, Timor-Leste, Vanuatu, Vietnam) was 84, the average score was 45 and the worst score was 15. For comparison with worldwide scores, the best score was 89 (ranked 1), the average score was 42, and the worst score was 9 (ranked 181, in a two-way tie).
