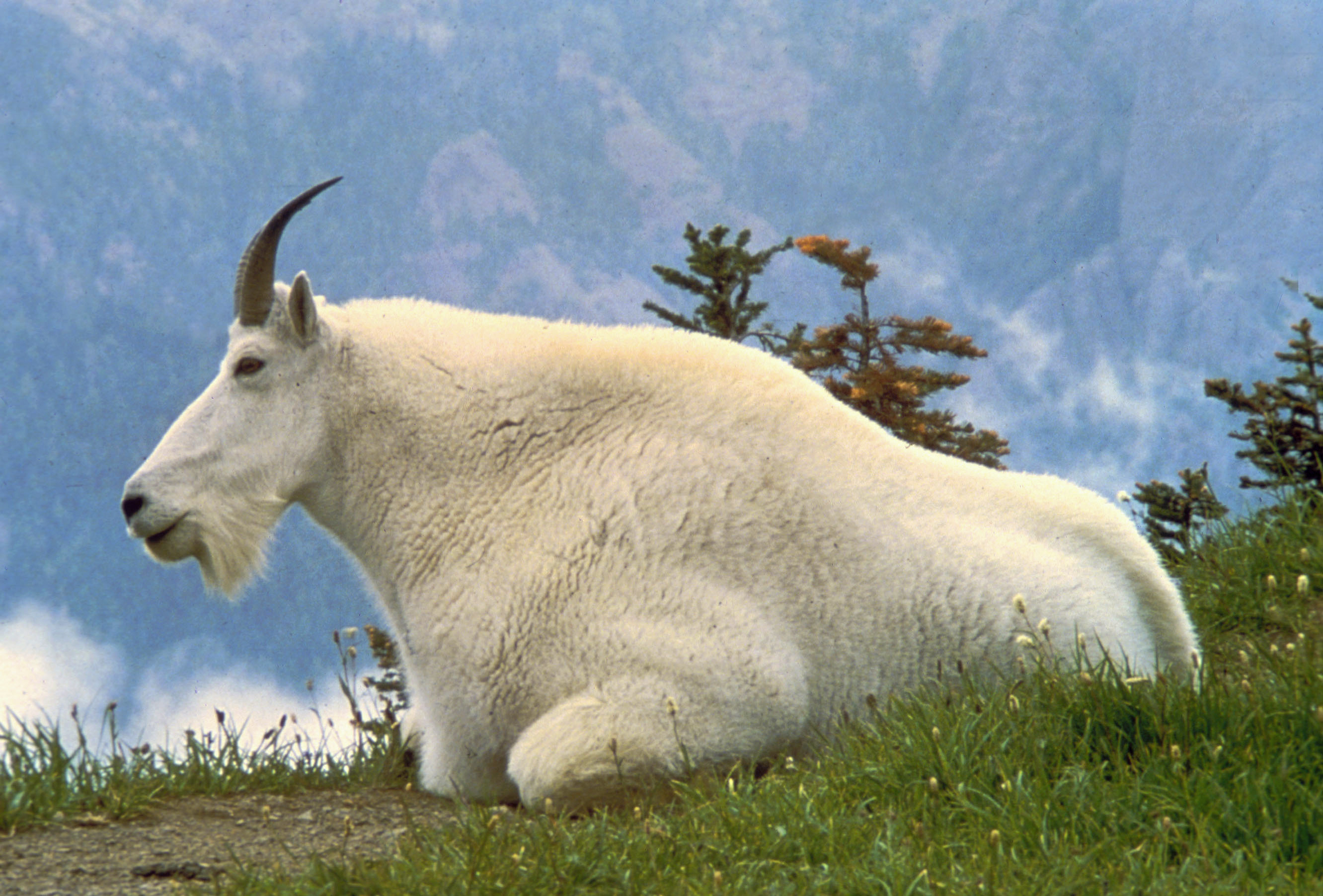

Scientific classification
- Kingdom: Animalia
- Phylum: Chordata
- Class: Mammalia
- Order: Artiodactyla
- Family: Bovidae
- Subfamily: Caprinae
- Tribe: Caprini
- Genus: Oreamnos; Rafinesque, 1817

Type species
- Mazama dorsata Rafinesque, 1817

Species
- O. americanus – mountain goat; †O. harringtoni – Harrington's mountain goat

= Oreamnos =

Genus of mammals

Oreamnos is a genus of North American caprines. The mountain goat (Oreamnos americanus) is the only living species. Until the end of the Pleistocene, another species, Oreamnos harringtoni, was distributed to the south of the recent form.
