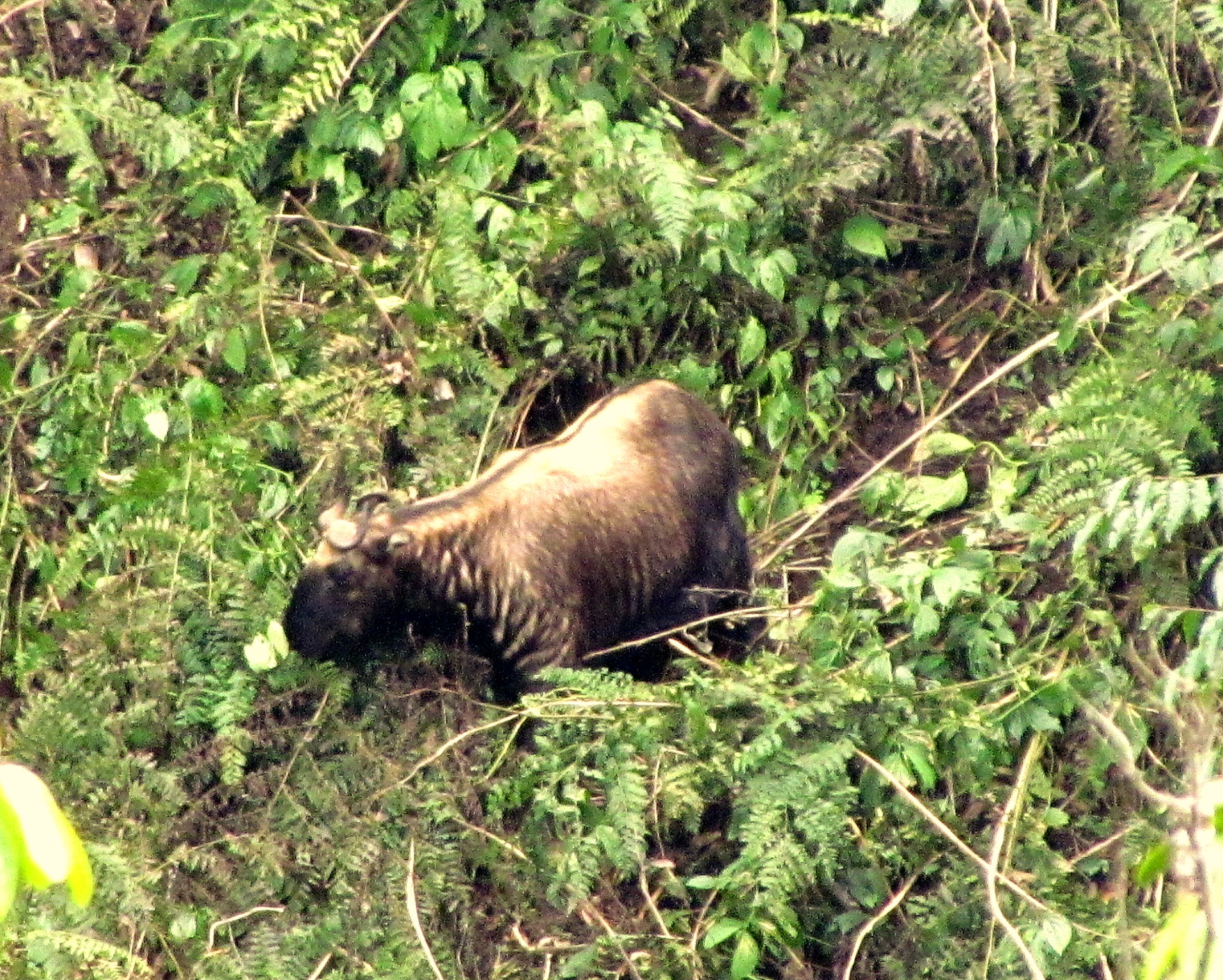
- Bhutan Takin, Jigme Dorji National Park

Conservation status
- Vulnerable (IUCN 3.1)

Scientific classification
- Kingdom: Animalia
- Phylum: Chordata
- Class: Mammalia
- Order: Artiodactyla
- Family: Bovidae
- Subfamily: Caprinae
- Genus: Budorcas
- Species: B. taxicolor
- Subspecies: B. t. whitei

Trinomial name
- Budorcas taxicolor whitei Lydekker, 1907
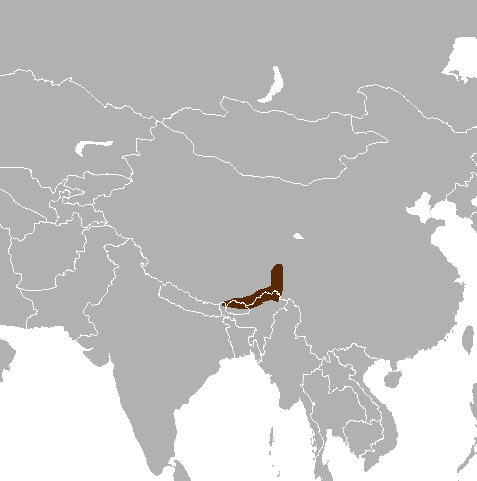

= Bhutan takin =

Subspecies of takin

The Bhutan takin (Budorcas taxicolor whitei) is a subspecies of takin native to Bhutan but also found in northeastern India, western China, and Tibet. Locally known as drong gimtse, it is Bhutan's national animal.

Takin have strongly featured in the popular Bhutan myth of divine cloning by the ‘Divine Madman’ Lama Drukpa Kunley, reinforcing the Takin's cultural and religious significance in Bhutan.

Being social creatures with a varied herbivorous diet, they thrive in the temperate and subtropical forests of eastern Asia. The species has been listed as Vulnerable on the IUCN Red List since 2015. It is protected in all range countries.

== Physical characteristics ==
Male wild specimens have been discovered weighing up to 302 kilograms (666 lb). They typically stand at shoulder heights ranging from 68 to 140 cm, with body lengths spanning 104 to 213 cm and tail lengths of 7 to 12 cm. Notably, males outsize females, and while there is no sexual dimorphism in coloration, female horns tend to be smaller. The hooves are broad and have pronounced dewclaws. Hairs on the lateral side of the body are 3–5 cm long. The longer hairs (7 cm) below the neck form a mane-like fringe. A beard-like appearance is provided by a hair length of more than 12 cm below the throat. In this species, large adult males appear slightly brighter orange compared to the darker females. In addition to their size, subadults can be identified by their straight protruding horns while older animals show curvature in their horns.

== Classification ==
The tribe Ovibovini includes the tundra Muskox Ovibos moschatus and takin Budorcas. The genus Budorcas includes one living species—Budorcas taxicolor Hodgson—and one extinct species—B. teilhardi Young. Budorcas taxicolor includes one extinct subspecies—B.t. lichii Young—and four extant subspecies—Bhutan takin B.t. whitei; grey or Sichuan takin B.t. tibetana; golden or Shaanxi takin B.t. bedfordi; and Mishmi takin B.t. taxicolor. B.t. bedfordi and B.t. whitei are the smallest among the four subspecies.

== Range, behaviour, and habitat ==
The takin is a socially aggregating generalist herbivore that migrates between sub-tropical forests as low as 700m in winter to sub-alpine regions up to 5,550m in summer. Migratory routes often traverse several transitional vegetation types at mid-altitudes ranging from conifer forests to broad-leaved forests. These varied habitat types are sources of an equally diverse diet for the takin that comprises grasses, herbs, bamboo, and the leaves of shrubs and trees.

In Bhutan, the occurrence of takin is reported from three protected areas Jigme Dorji National Park (JDNP) which is thought to be the stronghold of the species in Bhutan, Wangchuck Centennial National Park, Phrumsengla National Park, and three territorial forest divisions (Wangdue Territorial Forest Division, Paro Territorial Forest Division, Thimphu Territorial Forest Division) with the highest suitable winter habitat in JDNP.

The estimated population of Bhutan takin in JDNP is between 500 and 700, while estimates for other areas are not available.

In China, the species is known to inhabit from south of the Yarlung Tsangpo River on the southern-facing side of the eastern Himalayas, to the westerly bend of the river. In India it occurs in Arunachal Pradesh, West Bengal, and Sikkim.

Migratory routes follow steep river courses and ridges and there is an elevation difference of over 2500 m between summer and winter habitats across a horizontal distance of less than 15–20 km. Spring migration is slow, starting in April and extending to early May, and consists of movement by discrete, small groups, and then congregating in large groups in the summer habitats in June in Tsarijathang area.

Takins have a typical breeding phenology: mating takes place in mid-summer and birth and parturition takes place in the wintering habitat in March after a relatively long gestation period (210 to 240 days). Hence, the calves are about three months old when they arrive on the summer pastures in June.

== Predators ==
Due to their large size, the only animals capable of preying on adult takins include tigers, leopards (Panthera pardus), wild dogs, and black bears. On the other hand, calves are more susceptible to predation. In addition to bears and wolves, they must also watch out for snow leopards and large birds of prey like eagles, which can drag the calves off ledges and cause them to fall to their death.

== Relationship to humans ==
=== Conservation and threats ===
The Bhutan takin is strictly protected under the Schedule I of the Forests and Nature Conservation Act of Bhutan 1995 (22 a). The takin is legally protected in China as a Class I species, which the National Wildlife Law (1988) protects from hunting. Legal hunting of takin is not permitted in India, with the species listed under Schedule I of the Indian Wildlife (Protection) Act (1972).

Although legislatively well protected, the takin faces many threats throughout its range. Despite stringent protective legislation, they are hunted illegally for trophies and meat in India.

Threats for this species comes from competition for grazing habitat with domestic livestock and the potential transmission of zoonotic diseases from other species. Sharing their habitat with yaks, both in summer and winter, poses additional challenges for conservation. In the Tsharijathang Valley, where takin spend their summers, abandoned feral yak herding dogs have been observed chasing female takin and their dependent calves into the Tsharijathang River, leading to maternal abandonment of calves.

Conservation efforts for takin in Bhutan should prioritize reducing disturbances from domestic livestock through improved herding and animal husbandry practices. Environmentally friendly road construction, incorporating wildlife corridors, may also help, as roads have been shown to adversely affect takin habitat use.

=== Cultural depictions ===
The legend goes that one day Drukpa Kunley was asked to perform a miracle by the local villagers and he told them he would if they would first bring him a cow and a goat to eat.

The villagers, a bit confused, prepared the roasted cow and the goat and presented it to the Divine Madman who immediately devoured both of them in ten minutes. There was nothing left but the cleaned bones.

The madman then took the head of the goat, attached it to the skeleton of the cow, clapped his hands and, to the surprise of the whole village, the skeleton grew a full body, jumped up and ran into the meadow and began feeding.

== See also ==
- List of endangered and protected species of China
