= Hugo Pearson =

Royal Navy Admiral (1843–1912)

Admiral Sir Hugo Pearson KCB
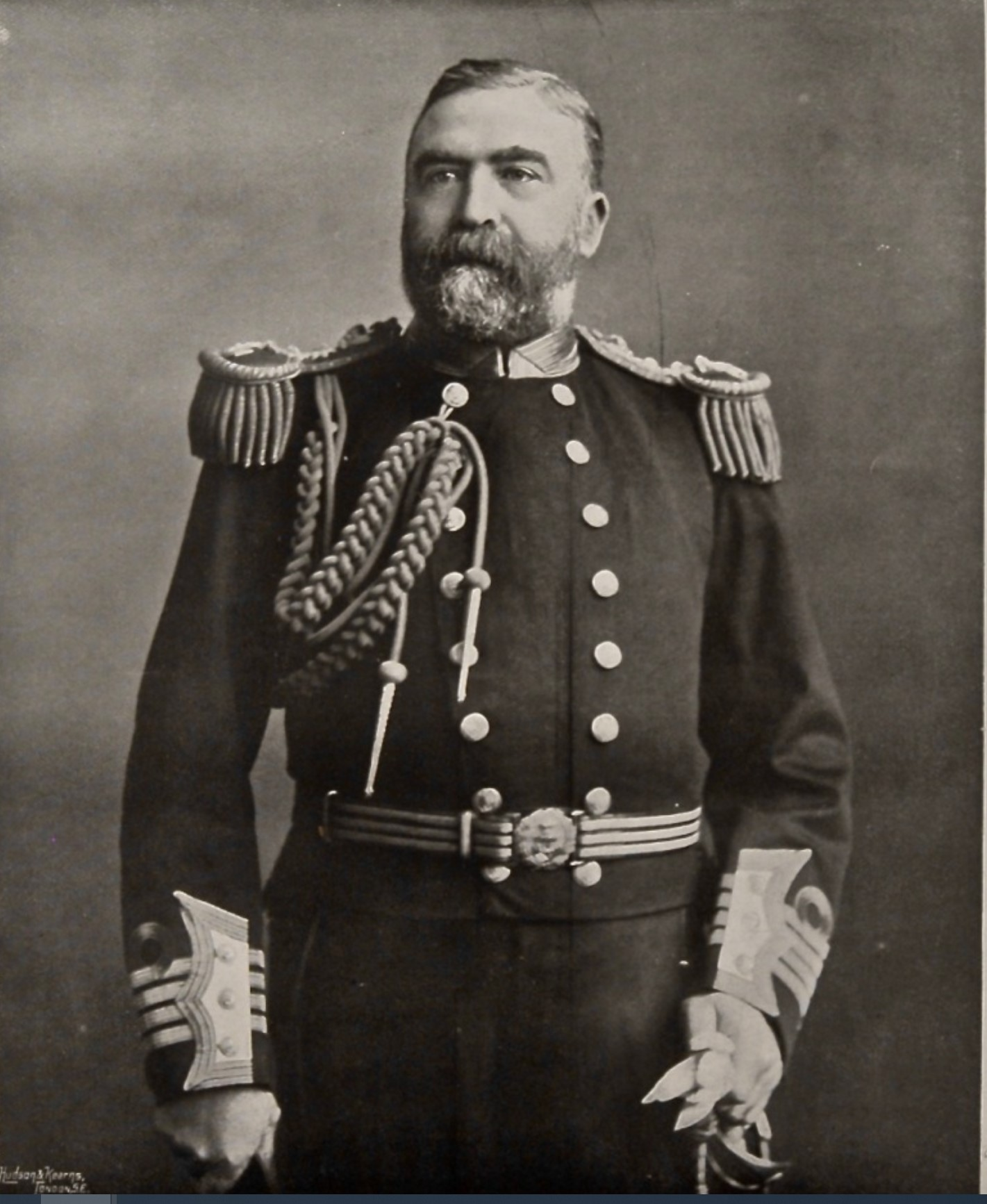
- Admiral Sir Hugo Lewis Pearson
- Born: 30 June 1843; Barwell, Leicestershire, England
- Died: 12 June 1912 (aged 68); Goodrich, Herefordshire, England
- Military career
- Allegiance: United Kingdom
- Branch: Royal Navy
- Service years: 1855–1908
- Rank: Admiral
- Commands: HMS St Vincent; HMY Osborne; HMS Colossus; HMS Excellent; HMS Collingwood; HMS Barfleur; Australia Station; Nore Command
- Awards: Knight Commander of the Order of the Bath

Admiral Sir Hugo Lewis Pearson, KCB (30 June 1843 – 12 June 1912) was a Royal Navy officer who served as both Commander-in-Chief, Australia Station and Commander-in-Chief, The Nore.

== Early life and education ==
Hugo Lewis Pearson was born at Barwell, into a notable Staffordshire family with a long tradition of service in India and the British Armed Forces. He was the grandson of John Pearson (1771–1841), a barrister and senior East India Company official who served as Advocate-General of Bengal from 1824 to 1840. His father General Thomas Hooke Pearson CB (1806–1892) served as an ADC to the Earl Amherst, then Governor-General of India. He married in 1837 Frances Elizabeth Ashby Mettam, eldest daughter of George Mettam, Rector of Barwell.

Pearson attended private schools in Southwell, Nottinghamshire and Wimbledon, London.

== Naval career ==
Pearson joined the Royal Navy in 1855, at the age of 12 years. In his early career, he was promoted to Lieutenant on 14 September 1863 and only 3 weeks later, on 20 October, Captain Henry Boys reported on Pearson's "active conduct in a fire breaking out out in the Pelorus." In February, 1865 Pearson destroyed piratical junks in Jungwa Bay.

Pearson was promoted to Commander with seniority of 6 February 1872, and was promoted to the rank of Captain with seniority of 9 December 1879.

He was Captain of the first-rate HMS St Vincent, the Royal yacht Osborne and the second-rate, HMS Colossus. He went on to command the shore establishment HMS Excellent and, later, the battleships HMS Collingwood and HMS Barfleur. Between 1892 and 1895 he was Aide-de-Camp to Queen Victoria, and was the Rear Admiral of the Reserve Fleet during the Jubilee Review in 1897.

In 1898 he became Commander in Chief, Australia Station and served as such for two years until late 1900, when he returned to the United Kingdom and bought Rocklands House in Goodrich, Herefordshire. On 19 March 1901, he was promoted to vice-admiral and in 1903 he became Commander-in-Chief, The Nore, a post he held until 1907. He retired on 30 June 1908.

== Personal life ==
In 1874 Pearson married Emily Frances Mary Key (1848–1930), second daughter of General George William Key (1812–1883) of the 15th Hussars. The couple had two sons and a daughter who survived into adulthood: two other children died in infancy. Their eldest son, Lieutenant Reginald William Pearson, was killed in 1900 in the Siege of Ladysmith during the Boer War and his parents erected a memorial window in Goodrich Church in his honour. His younger son was Vice-Admiral John Lewis Pearson CMG (1879–1965).

Hugo Pearson died on 12 June 1912, aged 69. He left estate of the gross value of £51,971, with net personalty of £43,888. His son John married in 1912 Phoebe Charlotte Beadon, daughter of Col. Cecil Beadon of Copthorne, and granddaughter of Cecil Beadon. He inherited Rocklands House. Their son Thomas Cecil Hook Pearson (1914–2019) was a senior officer of the British Army who served as Commander-in-Chief of Allied Forces Northern Europe.

== Arms ==
Coat of arms of Hugo Pearson

Crest
In front of a demi-sun in splendour proper, a parrot's head erased argent, gorged with a collar nebuly azure
Escutcheon
Per fesse nebuly, azure and sable, in chief, two suns in splendour, and in base, issuant from a mount, a sun-flower, stalked and leaved, all proper
Orders
Knight Commander of the Order of the Bath (KCB)

Military offices
| Preceded by Cyprian Bridge | Commander-in-Chief, Australia Station; 1898–1900 | Succeeded by Lewis Beaumont |
| Preceded by Sir Albert Markham | Commander-in-Chief, The Nore; 1903–1907 | Succeeded by Sir Gerard Noel |
