= Thimphu District =

District of Bhutan

Coordinates: 27°35′N 89°35′E

Thimphu Dzongkhag ཐིམ་ཕུ་རྫོང་ཁག། Thimphu District
- District
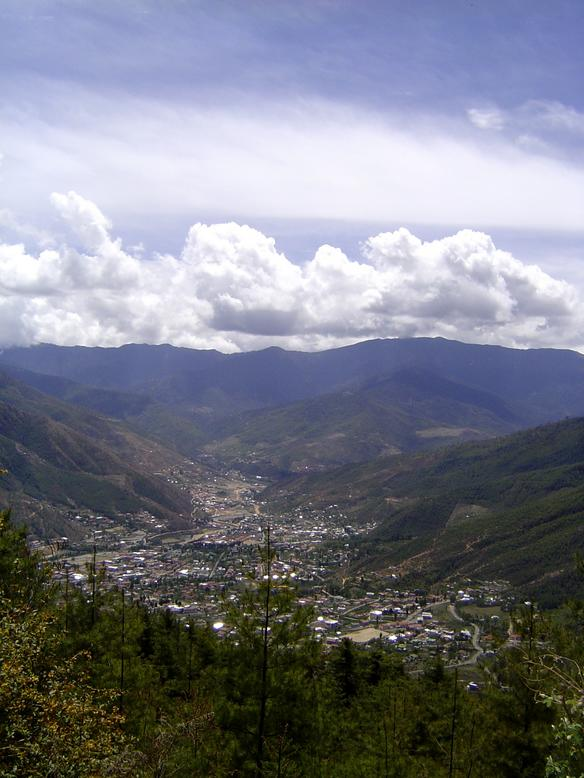
- Thimphu District

- Location of Thimphu district within Bhutan

- Location within Bhutan
- Country: Bhutan
- Headquarters: Thimphu

Area
  - Total: 2,067 km^{2} (798 sq mi)

Population (2017)
  - Total: 138,736
  - Rank: 1st
  - Density: 67.12/km^{2} (173.8/sq mi)
- Time zone: UTC+6 (BTT)
- HDI (2021): 0.832 very high · 1st
- Website: www.thimphu.gov.bt

Thimphu District (Dzongkha: ཐིམ་ཕུ་རྫོང་ཁག།; Wylie: Thim-phu rdzong-khag) is a dzongkhag (district) of Bhutan. Thimphu is also the capital of Bhutan and the largest city in the whole kingdom.

== Languages ==
The dominant language throughout the district is Dzongkha; however, within the capital nearly every language of Bhutan may be encountered.

== Cultural sites ==
Important cultural sites of Thimphu include:

- Druk Wangditse Lhakhang
- Dechen Phodrang Central Monastic School
- Tshelung Ney is the second Draphu Maratika where Guru Rinpoche received life empowerment (Tse Ngedrup) from Tsepakme.
- Chari Meditation Centre
- Druk Wangyel Complex, Dochula
- National Memorial Chorten
- Tango Choeying Dzong is the most important site of Phajo Drugom Zhigpo where Yidam Tandin appeared before him in person and delivered precepts to him.
- Dodeydra Buddhist Institute
- Changangkha Lhakhang
- Thuji Dra is one of the four cliffs of Guru Rinpoche prophesied to Phajo Drugom Zhigpo by Guru Rinpoche.
- Buddha Dordenma Statue at Buddha Point is one of the world’s largest and tallest Sitting Buddha statues. It is 169 feet (52 m) and sits upon a large meditation hall.
- Domtsang Ney is a meditative cave of Guru Rinpoche.
- Domendrel Tsho is a sacred lake near a place where Gyalse Tenzin Rabgye offered a Mandala to consecrate the Palace of Chador Namgyal, the King of Sikkim.
- Jagar Damkelsa Ney, the sacred cliff where Drubthob Nagi Rinchen meditated to rescue his mother who was born in a hell.

== Administrative divisions ==
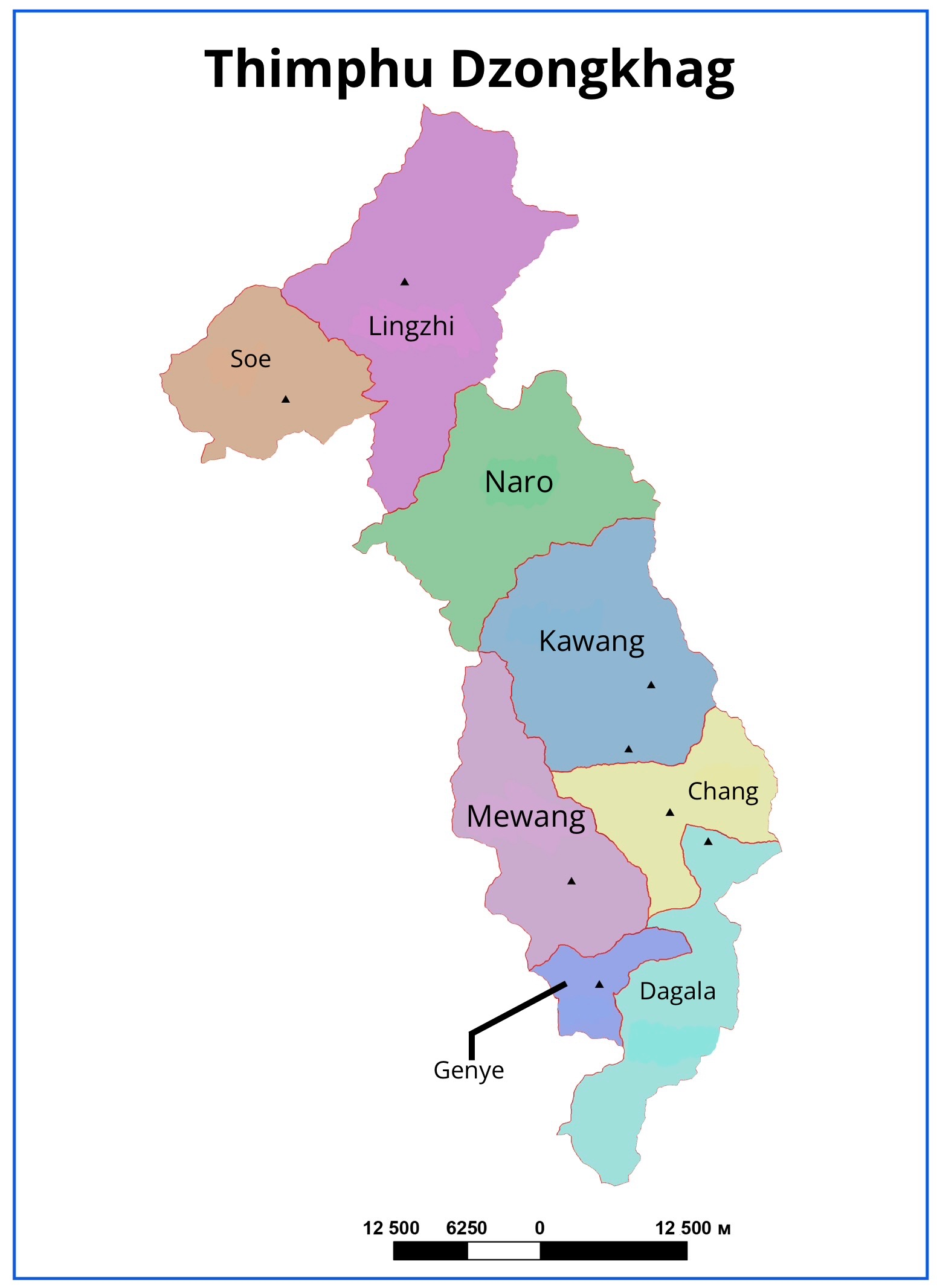
Map of Gewogs of Thimphu Dzongkhag

Thimphu District is divided into eight village groups (or gewogs) and one town (Thimphu):

- Chang Gewog
- Dagala Gewog
- Genye Gewog
- Kawang Gewog
- Lingzhi Gewog
- Mewang Gewog
- Naro Gewog
- Soe Gewog

Lingzhi, Soe and Naro Gewogs belong to the Lingzhi Dungkhag subdistrict, the only subdistrict within Thimphu District. The remaining gewogs do not belong to any subdistrict.

=== Town of Thimphu ===
Thimphu is the capital of Bhutan and of Thimphu District.

== Environment ==
The northern half of Thimphu District (the gewogs of Kawang, Lingzhi, Naro and Soe – corresponding roughly to Lingzhi Dungkhag) is subject to environmental protection, falling within Jigme Dorji National Park.

Thimphu District

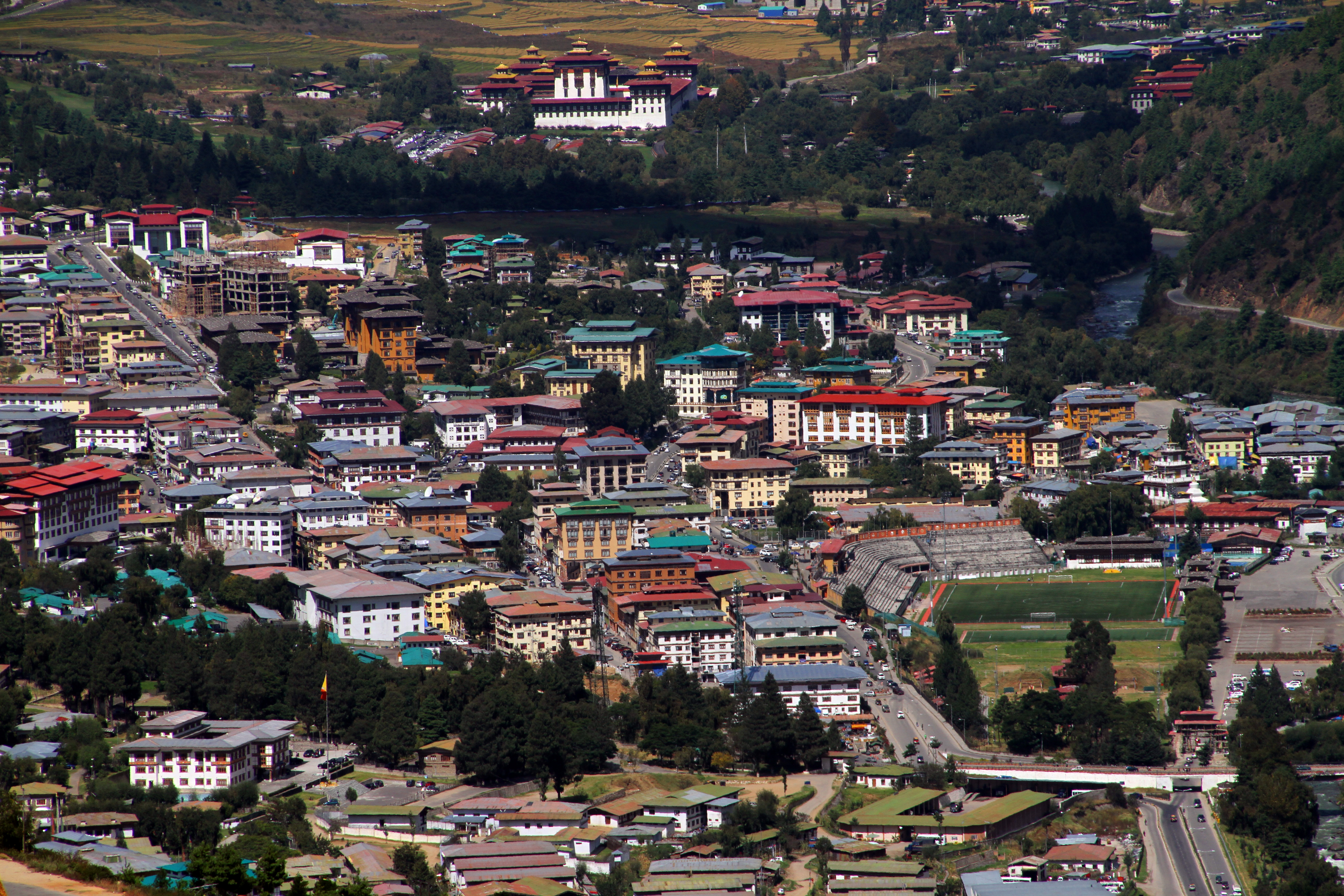
View of Thimphu

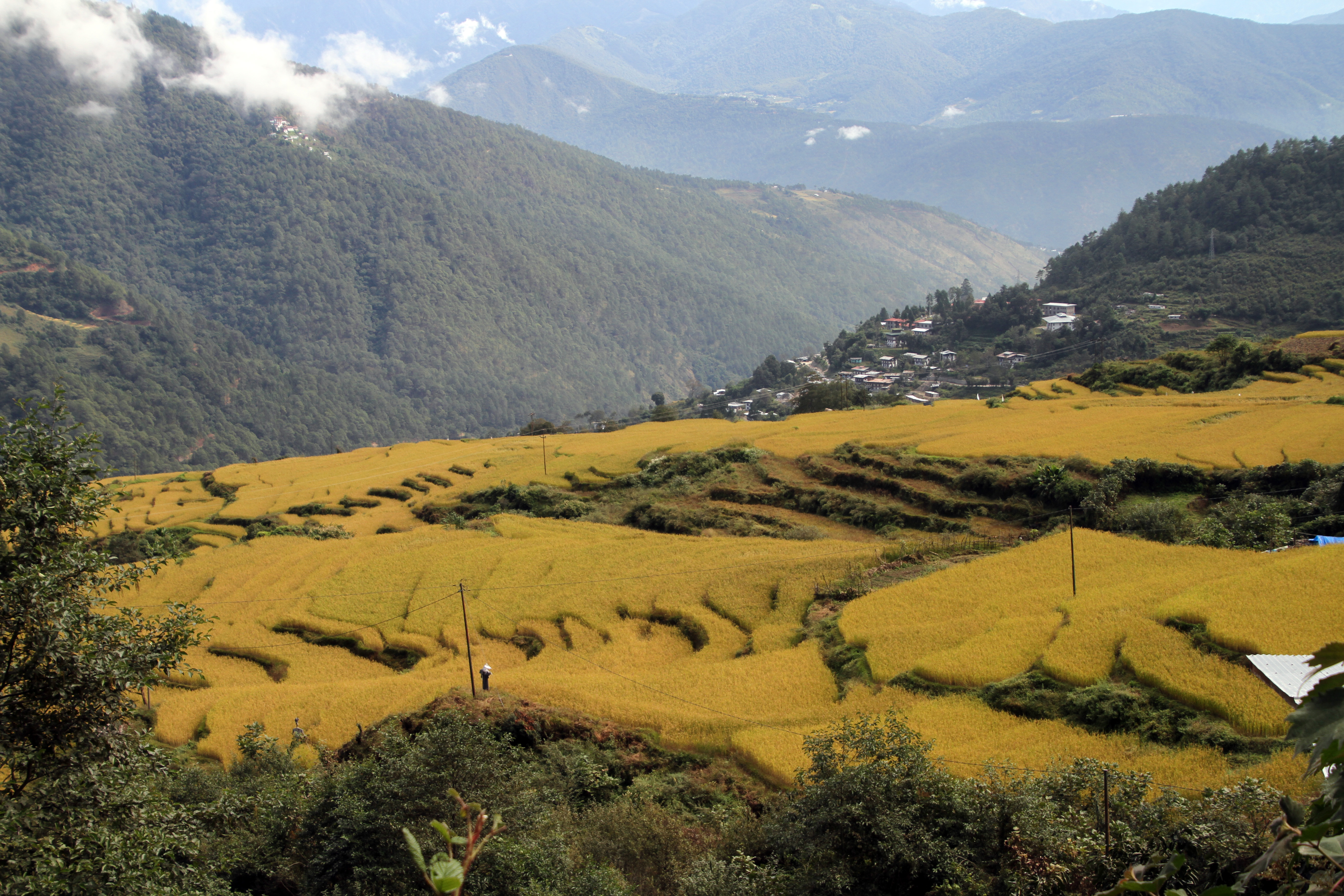
Rice terraces

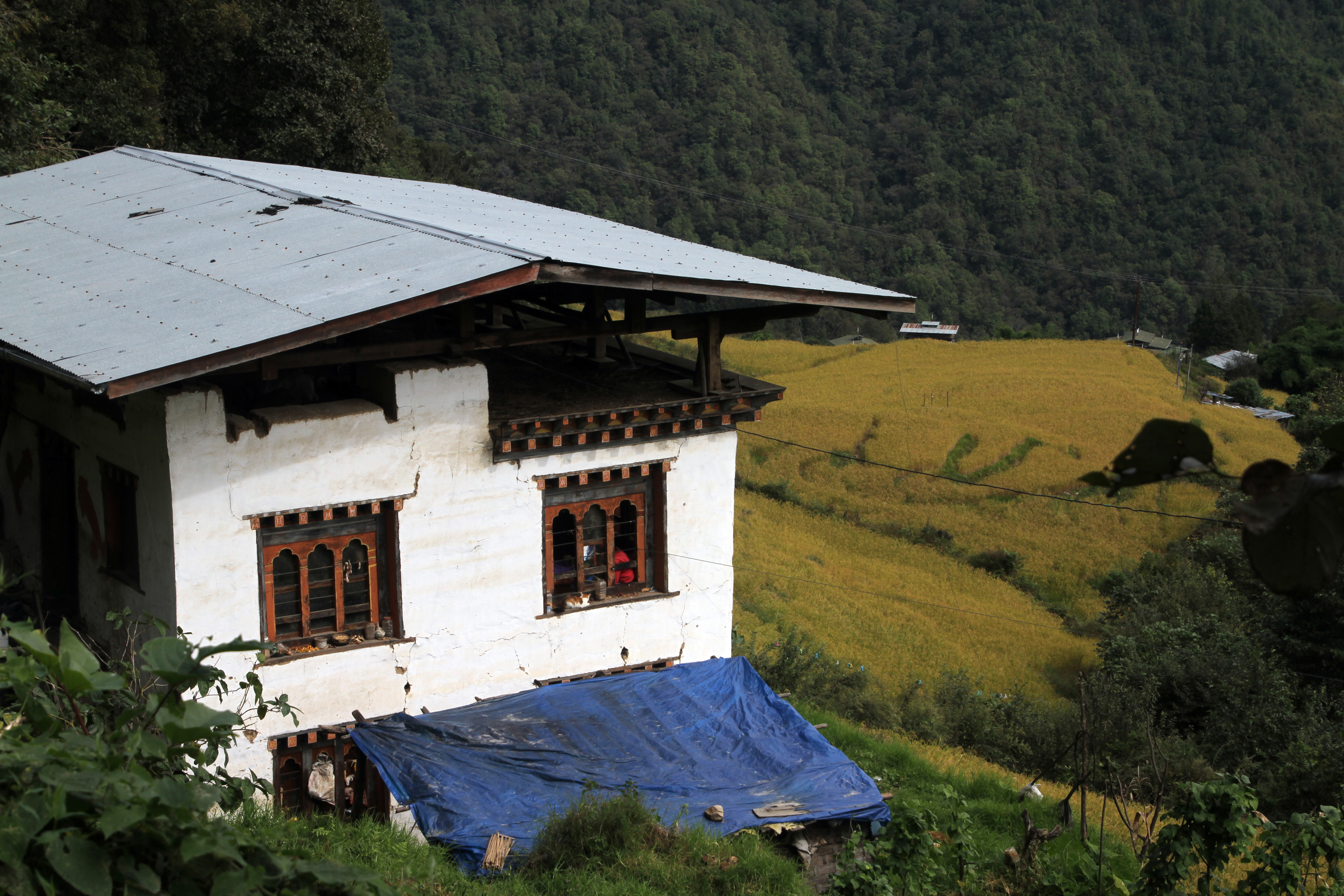
Traditional house

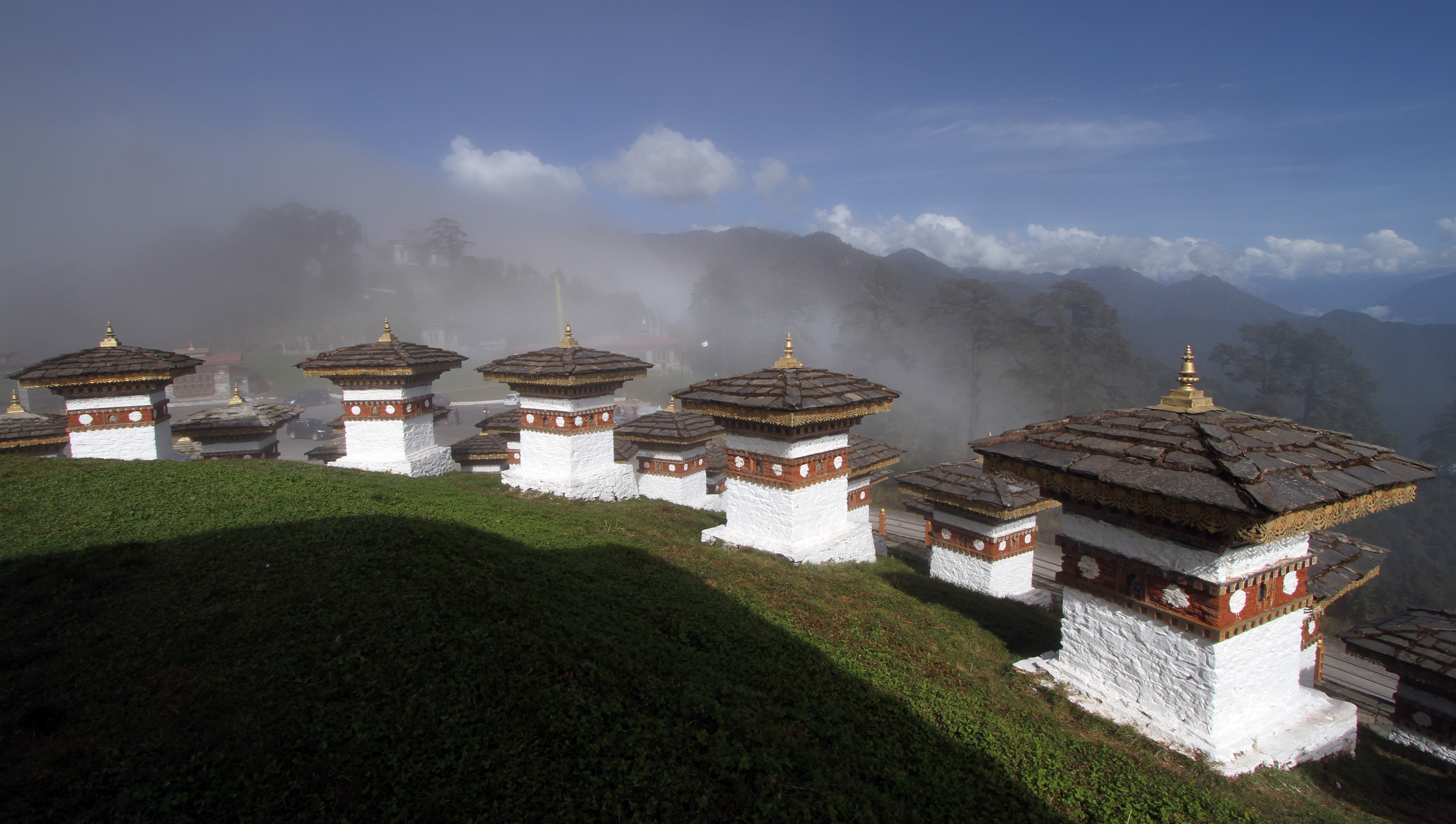
108 Choerten on the Dochu La

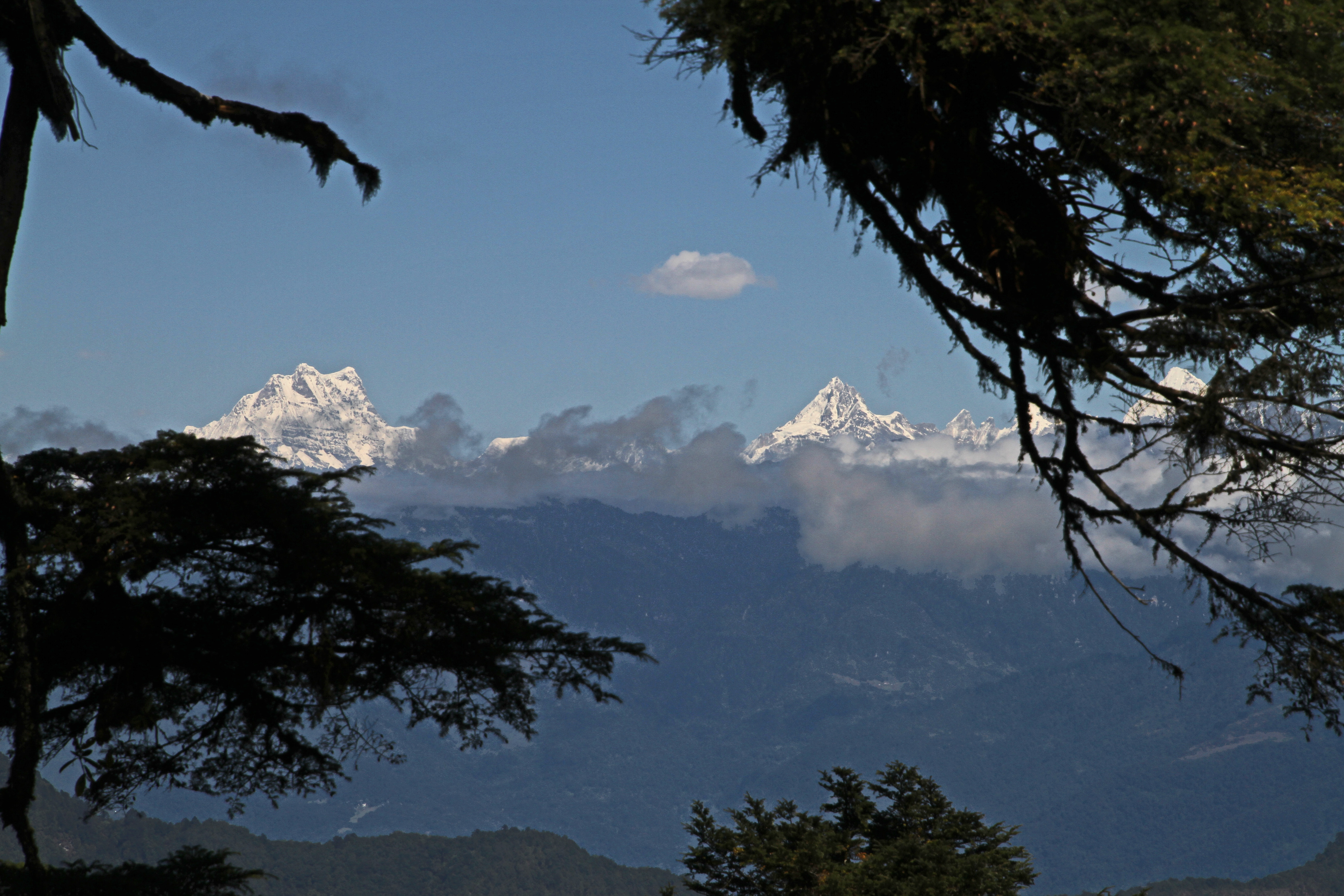
View from Dochu La

== Climate ==
Climate data for Thimphu-Simtokha, elevation 2,310 m (7,580 ft), (1996–2017 normals)
Month	Jan	Feb	Mar	Apr	May	Jun	Jul	Aug	Sep	Oct	Nov	Dec	Year
Record high °C (°F)	24.0 (75.2)	25.0 (77.0)	28.0 (82.4)	30.0 (86.0)	32.2 (90.0)	32.0 (89.6)	33.0 (91.4)	32.5 (90.5)	31.0 (87.8)	31.0 (87.8)	27.0 (80.6)	24.0 (75.2)	33.0 (91.4)
Mean daily maximum °C (°F)	14.8 (58.6)	16.6 (61.9)	19.3 (66.7)	22.4 (72.3)	24.8 (76.6)	26.7 (80.1)	27.0 (80.6)	27.3 (81.1)	26.0 (78.8)	23.7 (74.7)	19.7 (67.5)	16.6 (61.9)	22.1 (71.7)
Daily mean °C (°F)	6.3 (43.3)	8.5 (47.3)	11.6 (52.9)	15.1 (59.2)	18.2 (64.8)	21.0 (69.8)	21.8 (71.2)	21.7 (71.1)	20.3 (68.5)	16.3 (61.3)	11.5 (52.7)	7.9 (46.2)	15.0 (59.0)
Mean daily minimum °C (°F)	−2.2 (28.0)	0.3 (32.5)	3.8 (38.8)	7.9 (46.2)	11.6 (52.9)	15.3 (59.5)	16.5 (61.7)	16.1 (61.0)	14.6 (58.3)	9.0 (48.2)	3.2 (37.8)	−0.8 (30.6)	8.0 (46.4)
Record low °C (°F)	−8.5 (16.7)	−7.0 (19.4)	−7.0 (19.4)	−2.0 (28.4)	2.5 (36.5)	8.0 (46.4)	11.0 (51.8)	9.0 (48.2)	6.0 (42.8)	−3.0 (26.6)	−6.0 (21.2)	−7.5 (18.5)	−8.5 (16.7)
Average rainfall mm (inches)	6.3 (0.25)	9.2 (0.36)	20.4 (0.80)	29.9 (1.18)	49.8 (1.96)	97.7 (3.85)	152.8 (6.02)	120.8 (4.76)	73.9 (2.91)	43.1 (1.70)	1.2 (0.05)	3.7 (0.15)	608.9 (23.97)
Average rainy days	1.1	1.2	3.8	6.2	8.7	14.2	19.0	16.7	11.7	4.7	0.3	0.7	88.3
Average relative humidity (%)	68.6	62.6	62.8	60.2	63.2	67.0	72.7	72.2	71.2	66.6	62.1	64.0	66.1
Source 1: National Center for Hydrology and Meteorology
Source 2: World Meteorological Organization (rainy days 1996–2018)

== See also ==
- Districts of Bhutan
- Dungkhag
- Thimphu Province
