= General Pearson =

General Pearson may refer to:

- Alfred Astley Pearson (1850–1937), British Indian Army general
- Alfred L. Pearson (1838–1903), Union Army brevet major general
- Charles Pearson (British Army officer) (1834–1909), British Army lieutenant general
- Peter Pearson (British Army officer) (born 1954), British Army lieutenant general
- Sandy Pearson (1918–2012), Australian Army major general
- Thomas Pearson (British Army officer, born 1782) (1782–1847), British Army lieutenant general
- Thomas Pearson (British Army officer, born 1914) (1914–2019), British Army general
- Thomas Hooke Pearson (1806–1892), British Army general
- Willard Pearson (1915–1996), U.S. Army lieutenant general
