= Governor Campbell =

Governor Campbell may refer to:

- Archibald Campbell (British Army officer, born 1739) (1739–1791), Governor of Georgia from 1778 to 1779, Governor of Jamaica from 1781 to 1784, and Governor of Madras from 1786 to 1789
- Carroll A. Campbell Jr. (1940–2005), 112th Governor of South Carolina
- Colin Campbell (British Army officer, born 1754) (1754–1814), Acting Governor of Gibraltar from 1809 to 1814
- Colin Campbell (British Army officer, born 1776) (1776–1847), 8th Governor of British Ceylon from 1841 to 1847
- David Campbell (British Army officer) (1869–1936), Governor and Commander-in-Chief Malta from 1931 to 1936
- David Campbell (Virginia politician) (1779–1859), 27th Governor of Virginia
- Sir Donald Campbell, 1st Baronet, of Dunstaffnage (1800–1850), 10th Governor of Prince Edward Island from 1847 to 1850
- Henry Dundas Campbell (1798–1872), Governor of Sierra Leone from 1835 to 1837
- James Campbell (governor) (died 1835), Acting Governor of British Ceylon from 1822 to 1824
- Jack M. Campbell (1916–1999), 21st Governor of New Mexico
- James E. Campbell (1843–1924), 38th Governor of Ohio
- John Allen Campbell (1835–1880), 1st Governor of the Wyoming Territory
- John Campbell (Royal Navy officer) (1720–1790), Commodore Governor of Newfoundland from 1782 to 1785
- John Campbell, 4th Earl of Loudoun (1705–1782), Governor General of Virginia from 1756 to 1757 and Governor of Edinburgh Castle from 1763 to 1782
- Lord Neill Campbell (1630–1692), Acting Governor of East New Jersey in 1686
- Thomas Edward Campbell (1878–1944), 2nd Governor of Arizona
- Thomas Mitchell Campbell (1856–1923), 24th Governor of Texas
- William B. Campbell (1807–1867), 14th Governor of Tennessee
- William Campbell (British Army officer and Governor) (died 1796), Governor of Bermuda in 1796
- Lord William Campbell (died 1778), Governor of Nova Scotia from 1766 to 1773
