= Kawang Gewog =

Kawang Gewog ཀ་ཝང་
- Gewogs
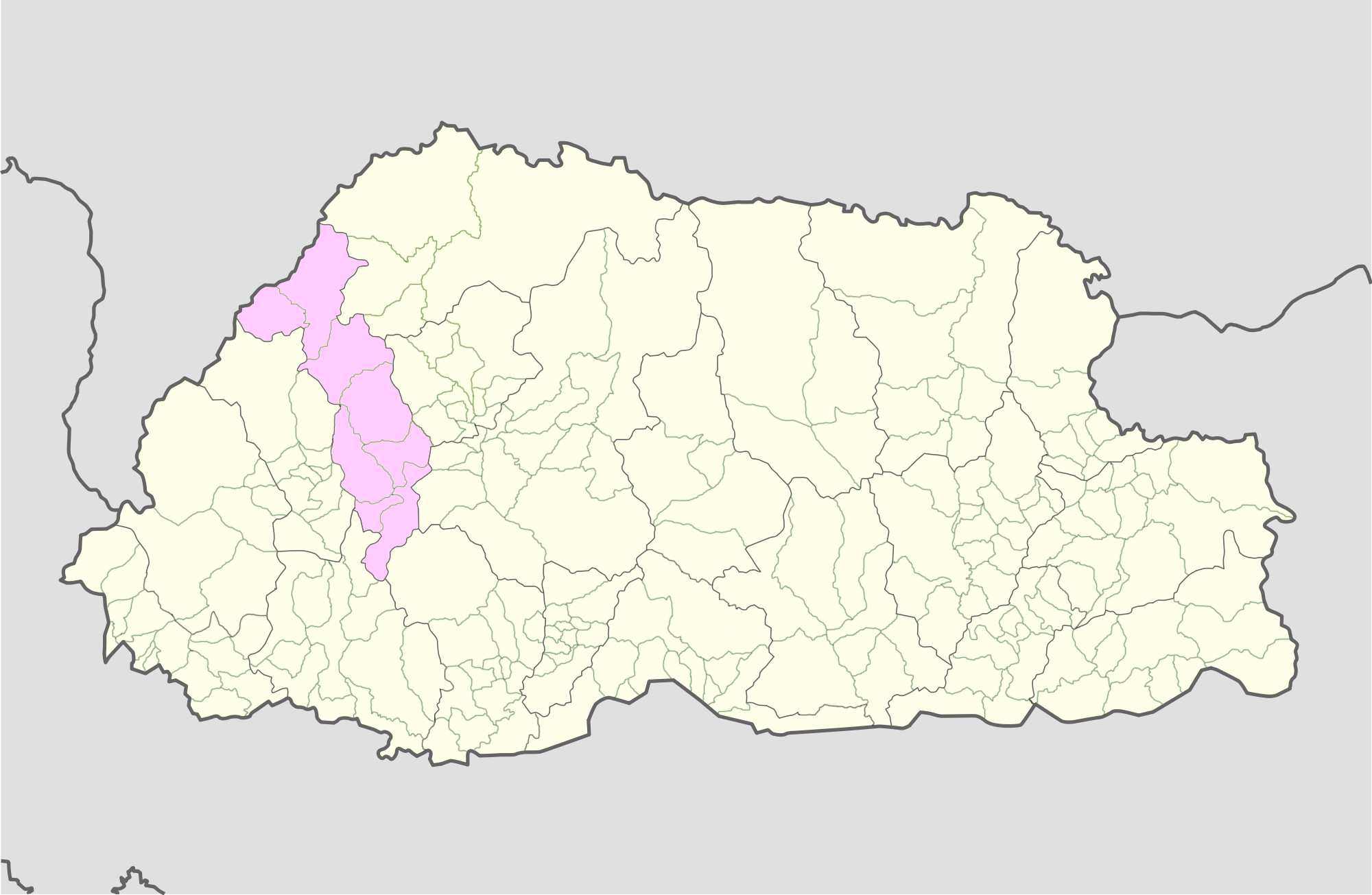
- Country: Bhutan
- District: Thimphu District
- Time zone: UTC+6 (BTT)

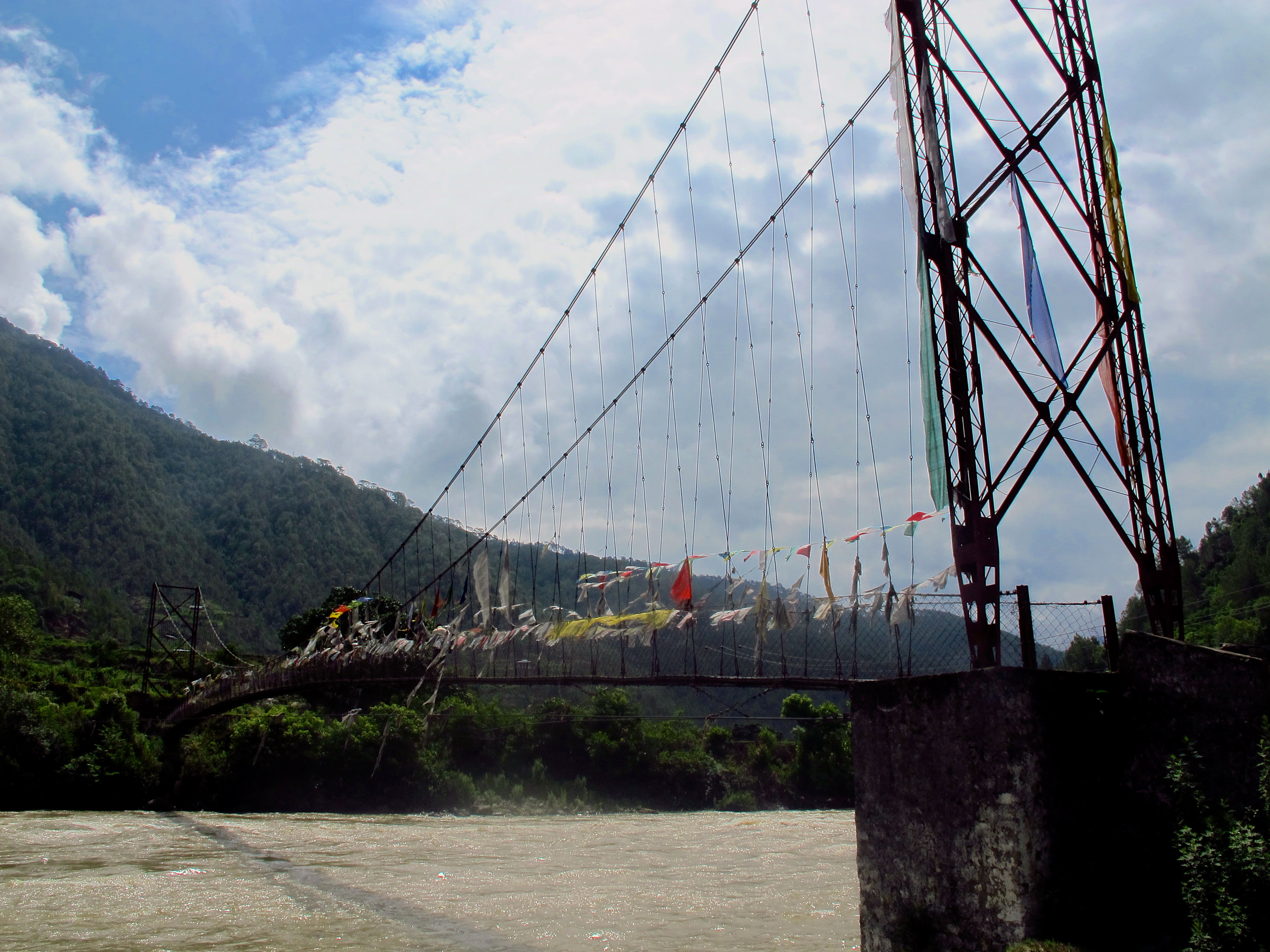
Footbridge in Kawang

Kawang Gewog (Dzongkha: ཀ་ཝང་) is a gewog (village block) of Thimphu District, Bhutan. As of 2005 it has a population of 2,582 and covers an area of 307 square kilometers.

The district has 383 households. Under Kawang Gewog there are many temples and lhakhangs namely Thujidra, Phajoding in the north
