= Rocklands House, Goodrich =

Building in Goodrich, Herefordshire, England

Coordinates: 51°51′38″N 2°37′30″W

Rocklands House near Goodrich, Herefordshire, England, is a building of historical significance and is Grade II listed on the English Heritage Register. It was built in the 1700s, and substantial additions were made in 1800. It was the home of many notable people over the next two centuries.

== Early residents ==
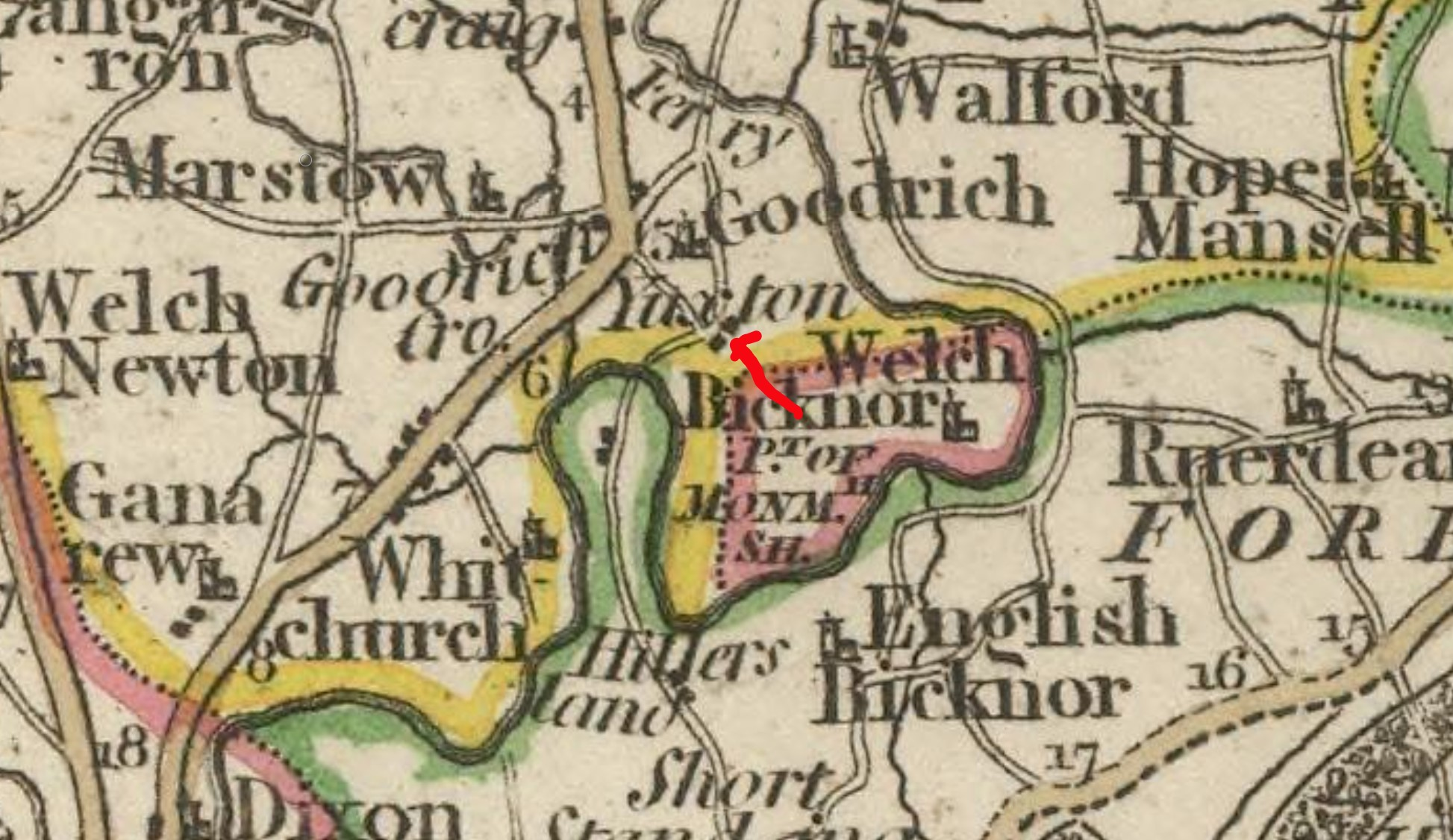
Map of 1794 which shows the older house called Yuxton

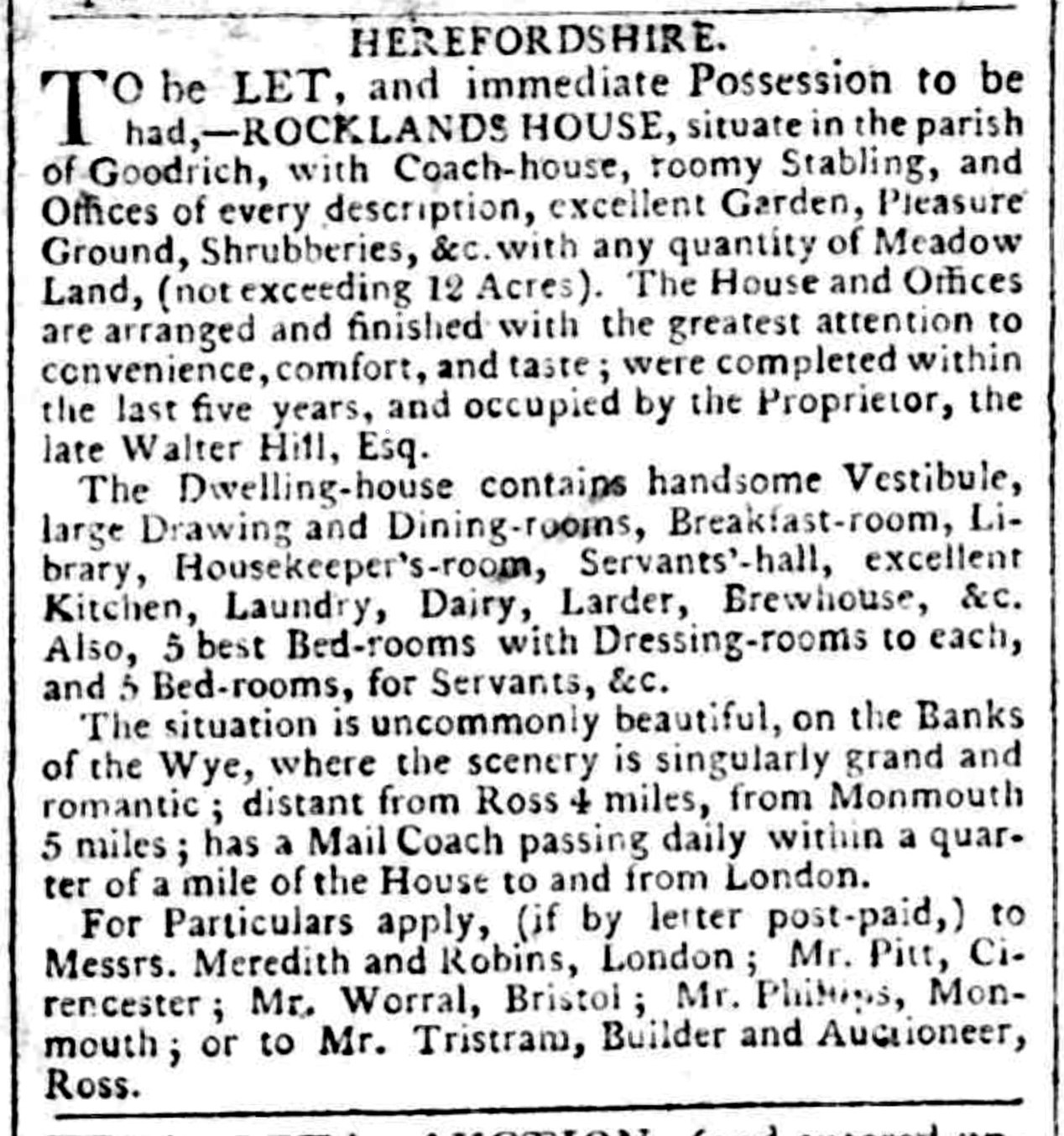
Rental notice for Rocklands House in 1808

In the 1700s the house was named Yuxton (sometimes it was called Yoxton). It was owned by the Hill family who were wealthy landowners in Llangarren and Goodrich. The map of 1794 shows the older house. It is recorded as being the property of Thomas Hill in the early 1700s and it then passed to his son Guy Hill and then to Walter Hill, who made the major additions to the core of the house and renamed it Rocklands House. This event was described in a book of 1800 in the following terms:

At Yuxton, Walter Hill is building a handsome mansion which when completed will equal the finest in the area. The house occupies a gentle rise a short distance from the edge of the river, fronted by a beautiful lawn and protected in the back ground by the Coppet Hill round which the Wye makes such an extensive sweep and from whose summit we enjoy a most beautiful view of the principal objects noticed in these pages. Days might be passed with pleasure in contemplating the landscapes which from every point spread themselves before us. It reflects the highest credit on the taste and sociability of the gentlemen of fortune in this county by the erection of a house in such a spot as we are now speaking of.

Walter Hill was an attorney who lived in Ross-on-Wye and was at one time the owner of Merton House and many other properties. In 1789 he married Clarissa Hutchinson who was the daughter of Norton Hutchinson of Mardock House, Herefordshire. The couple had two children, a daughter and a son. When Walter died in 1808 his son the Reverend Walter Henry Hill inherited Rocklands House when he came of age. He did not live there but instead it was rented to wealthy tenants for the next 25 years. In about 1830 Walter sold the property to Henry Williams Ross.

Henry Williams Ross was a merchant in the firm Ross Brothers of Liverpool. The 1841 Census shows him living at Rocklands House with his wife Elizabeth and their eight children. The Ross family left in 1847 and the house was sold to John Maurice Herbert.

== Later residents ==
Judge John Maurice Herbert was a judge in the county courts and lived at Rocklands for the next 35 years. He was a personal friend of Charles Darwin while they were both at the University of Cambridge and for some years afterwards. He wrote some recollection of his Cambridge experiences with Darwin from Rocklands House in 1882. His biography was outlined in a prominent Welsh Magazine at this reference.

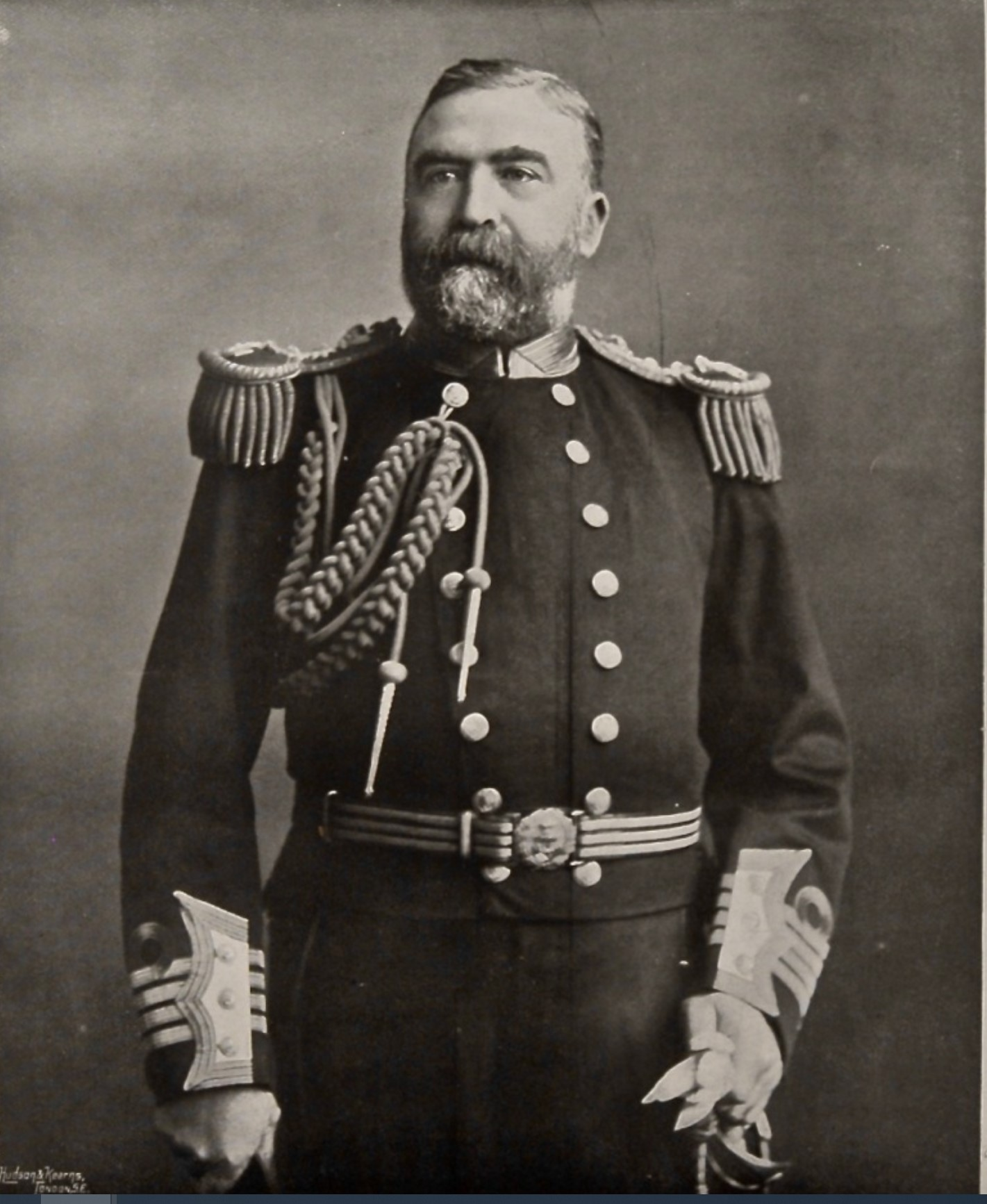
Admiral Sir Hugo Lewis Pearson

He was born in 1808 in Madley Herefordshire and shortly before his birth his father John Lawrence Herbert died. His mother Joyce Susannah Jones remarried Thomas Maddy of Moreton House and had a son Thomas Watkin Maddy. In 1840 John married Mary Ann Johnes and the couple came to live at Rocklands. The 1861 Census shows them in the house with a butler, a cook, a housemaid, a nurse and a dairymaid. They had no children and in 1876 Mary Ann died. John subsequently married in 1877 Mary Charlotte Phillpotts. John died in 1882 and the house was left to his nephew Thomas Herbert Maddy, who was a barrister. He did not live there but instead rented it to several notable tenants. In 1885 Canon David Mapleton was in residence. In1891 Edward Waugh Rumsey was the tenant. In 1900 it was sold to Sir Hugo Lewis Pearson.

Admiral Sir Hugo Lewis Pearson joined the Royal Navy at a very early age and quickly rose through the ranks. Between 1892 and 1895 he was Aide-de-Camp to Queen Victoria and later was the Commissioner of the Australian Station. In 1874 he married Emily Frances Mary Key (1848-1930) who was the daughter of General George William Key. The couple had two sons and a daughter. In 1901 their eldest son Lieutenant Reginald Pearson was killed in the War in South Africa and his parents erected a memorial window in Goodrich Church in his honour which can still be seen today.

Hugo Pearson died in 1912, and his son Vice-Admiral John Lewis Pearson inherited the house. He lived there with his wife Phoebe Charlotte Beadon until about 1955 and then moved to the Old Rectory at Brampton Abbots.
