= Mewang Gewog =

Mewang Gewog སྨད་ཝང་
- Gewogs
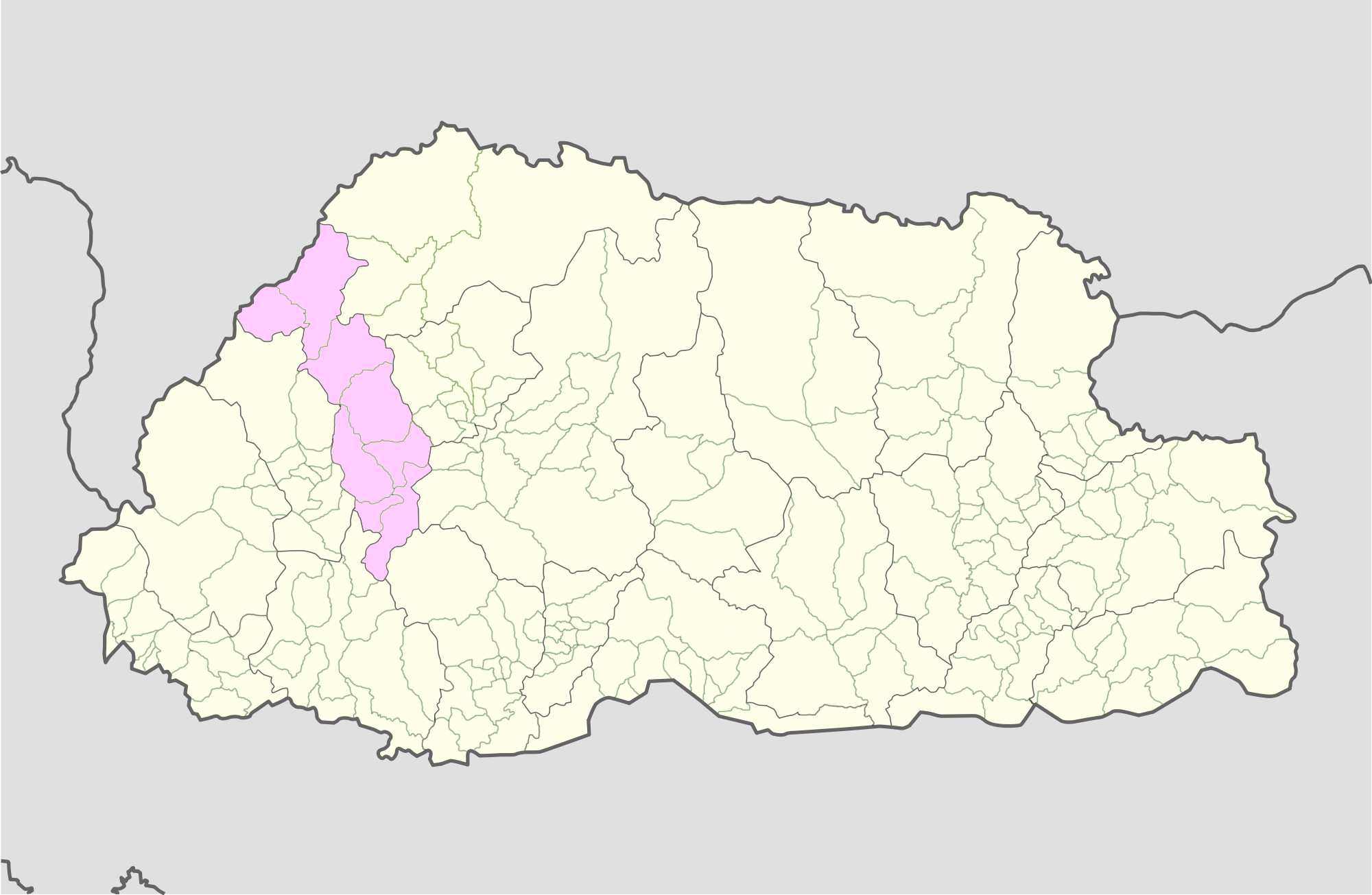
- Country: Bhutan
- District: Thimphu District
- Time zone: UTC+6 (BTT)

Mewang Gewog (Dzongkha: སྨད་ཝང་) is a gewog (village block) of Thimphu District, Bhutan.
