= Druk Wangditse Lhakhang =

Buddhist temple in Thimphu, Bhutan

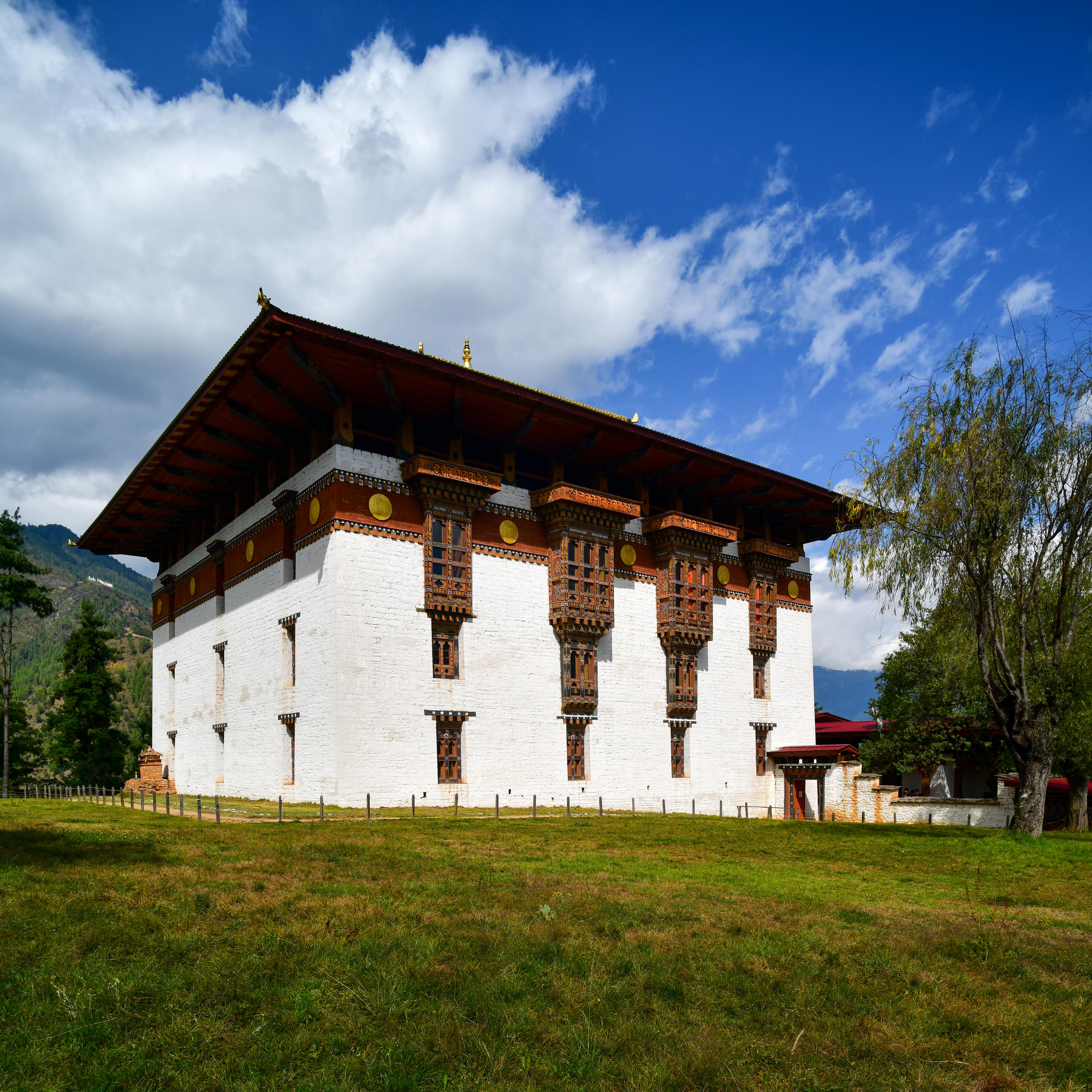
- Druk Wangditse Lhakhang

Religion
- Affiliation: Tibetan Buddhism

Location
- Country: Bhutan
- Geographic coordinates: 27°29′46.13″N 89°37′35.47″E

Architecture
- Date established: 1715; 310 years ago

Druk Wangditse Lhakhang (Dzongkha: འབྲུག་དབང་འདུས་རྩེ་ལྷ་ཁང་), the "Temple of the Peak of Conquest" is located high on a forested ridge to the south of Tashichho Dzong overlooking the whole Thimphu valley. It was established in 1715 as the seat of the 8th Druk Desi, Druk Rabgye.

Druk Wangditse Lhakhang is one of the oldest temples in Thimphu, and considered an important heritage site of Bhutan. According to the history of Wangditse temple, the present site of Wangditse was blessed by Zhabdrung Ngawang Namgyal when he traveled from Pangri Zampa Monastery to Paro. As it is located only a 40-minute walk from Sangaygang in Thimphu, it is also a popular local picnic spot and visitor attraction just like Phajoding Monastery.

During the 2011 Himalayan earthquake, the original temple suffered extensive damage, but it has since been rebuilt, using a drawing of the earlier temple by Samuel Davis, who visited Bhutan in 1783, as well as archaeological findings, as a guide. On January 24 to February 5, 2020, it was re-consecrated in a ceremony led by the Laytshog Lopon, Sangay Dorji, of the Zhung Dratshang.

The restored temple still contains the original large gilt copper statue of Shakyamuni Buddha, flanked by the bodhisattvas Mañjuśrī and Avalokiteśvara. On each of the two side walls are four large stupas together representing the eight great stupas (Chöten Deshey-gyed). On the second floor is a temple with murals depicting the deities of the mandalas of Hayagriva and Vajrakilaya, as well as figures of Indian Mahasiddhas and successive lamas of the Bhutanese Drukpa Kagyu tradition. At the rear of that floor there is a closed dharmapāla chapel dedicated to Yeshe Gonpo (Chaturbhuja Mahakala) which also contains images of Shri Devi (Palden Lhamo Dudsolma) and Tsheringma as well as protectors of the 20 Dzongkhags.
