= Genye Gewog =

Gengye Gewog དགེ་བསྙེན་
- Gewogs
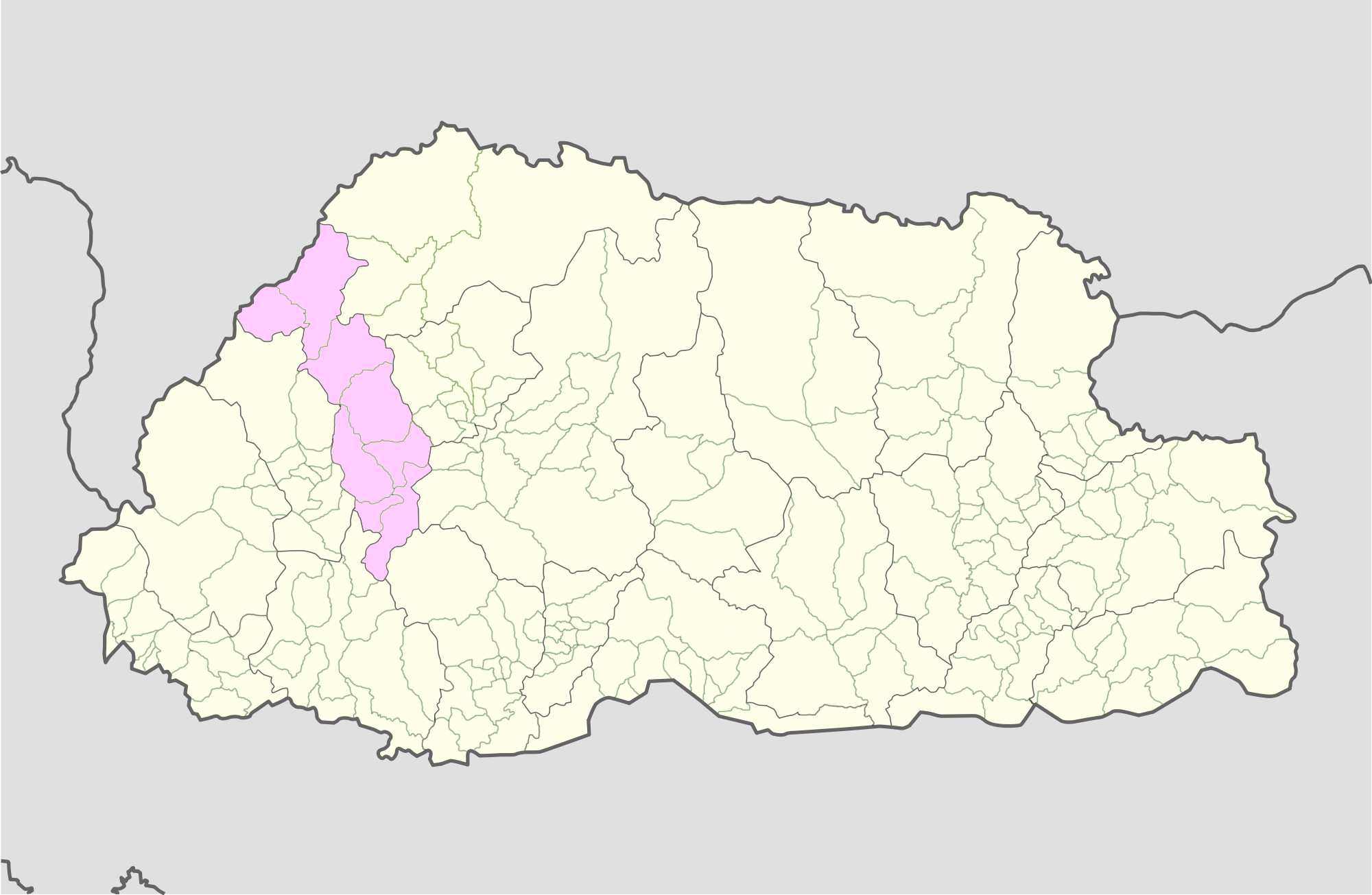
- Country: Bhutan
- District: Thimphu District
- Time zone: UTC+6 (BTT)

Genye Gewog (Dzongkha: དགེ་བསྙེན་) is a gewog (village block) of Thimphu District, Bhutan.
