= Darkarla Gewog =

Darkarla Gewog དར་དཀར་ལ་
- Gewogs
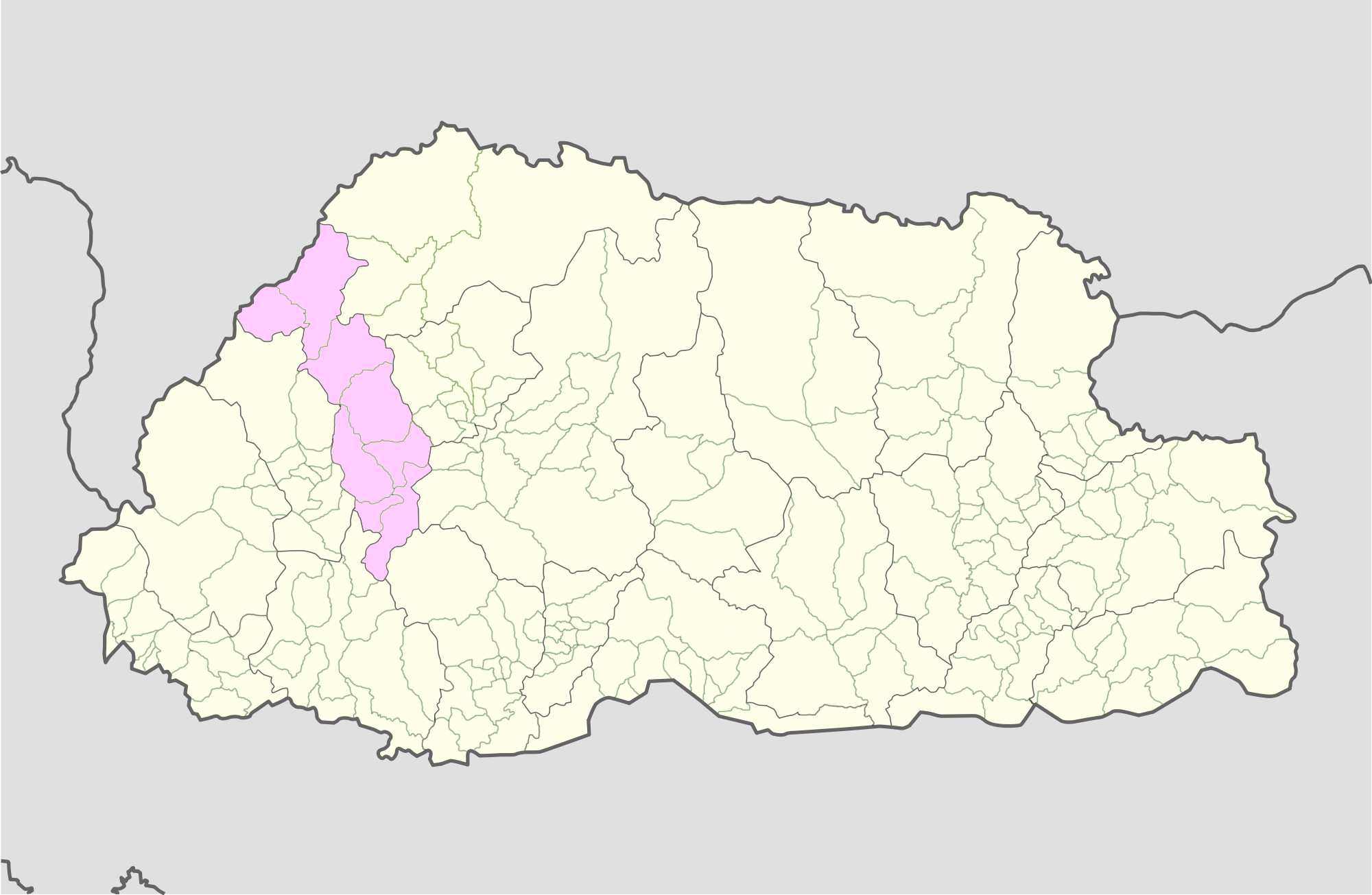
- Country: Bhutan
- District: Thimphu District
- Time zone: UTC+6 (BTT)

Darkarla Gewog (Dzongkha: དར་དཀར་ལ་) is a gewog (village block) of Thimphu District, Bhutan.

== Dagala Trek ==
Dagala is known for its thousand lakes trek, a six day trek along the ancient trails from Thimphu to Dagala The trails were once used by Daga Penlops and porters for transportation between Dagana and Thimphu. The popular trek does not go to Dagana.

There are numerous pristine lakes across the trails and yak herders can also be found along the way.
