= Samuel Davis (orientalist) =

English soldier, diplomat and orientalist

Samuel Davis (1760–1819) was an English soldier turned diplomat who later became a director of the East India Company (EIC). He was the father of John Francis Davis, one time Chief Superintendent of British Trade in China and second governor of Hong Kong.

== Early life ==
Samuel was born in the West Indies the younger son of soldier John Davis, whose appointment as Commissary general there had been signed by King George II in 1759 and countersigned by William Pitt. After his father died, Davis returned to England with his mother (who was of Welsh descent, née Phillips) and his two sisters. He became a cadet of the EIC under the aegis of director Laurence Sulivan in 1788, and sailed for India aboard the Earl of Oxford, which also brought the artist William Hodges to India, arriving in Madras in early 1780.

== Bhutan ==
In 1783, Warren Hastings, the Governor of the Presidency of Fort William (Bengal) assigned Davis "Draftsman and Surveyor" on Samuel Turner's forthcoming mission to Bhutan and Tibet. Unfortunately, the Tibetans (or more probably the Chinese ambans, the de facto authority in Tibet) viewed his "scientific" profession with suspicion and he was forced to remain in Bhutan until Turner and the others returned. Whilst in Bhutan he turned his attention to recording the buildings and landscape of the country in a series of drawings. These were published some 200 years later as Views of Medieval Bhutan: the diary and drawings of Samuel Davis, 1783.

== Bhagalpur ==
On his return from Bhutan, in around 1784 he became Assistant to the Collector of Bhagalpur and Registrar of its Adalat Court. In Bhagalpur he met lawyer and orientalist William Jones who had recently founded The Asiatic Society of which Davis subsequently became a member. The two became firm friends based on their shared love of mathematics while along with another member of The Asiatic Society, Reuben Burrow, Davis studied astronomical tables obtained by the French astronomer Guillaume Le Gentil, French Resident at the Faizabad court of Shuja-ud-Daula who in turn had obtained them from Tiruvallur Brahmins on the Coromandel Coast. The tables showed accurate Indian scientific knowledge of astronomy dating back to the third century BCE. As part of his research, Davis also learned Sanskrit and Hindi. For the next ten years, Jones and Davis carried on a running correspondence on the topic of jyotisha or Hindu astronomy. While in Bhagalpur, Davis also met landscape artist Thomas Daniell and his nephew William whom he encouraged to visit the Himalayas. In 1792 he was elected a Fellow of the Royal Society.

== Burdwan and Benares ==
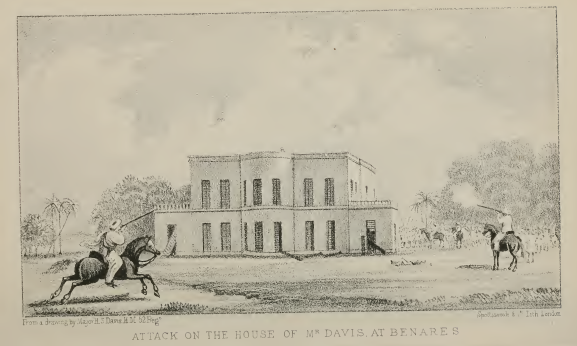
Engraving of the attack on the Davis residence in Benares, 14 January 1799.

Davis' next appointment was as Collector of Burdwan, a town in the Bengal Presidency. He then spent 1795–1800 in Benares (now Varanasi), this time as Magistrate of the district and city court. Benares was also home to former ruler of Oudh State, Wazir Ali Khan, who had been forcibly deposed by the British in 1797. In 1799, the British authorities decided to remove Ali Khan further from his former realm and as a result rioting broke out. Davis singlehandly defended his family by shepherding them to the roof of his residence and defending the single access point with a pike. The incident was the subject of a book by his son, John F. Davis, entitled Vizier Ali Khan or The Massacre of Benares, A Chapter in British Indian History published in london in 1871.

== Later career ==
During the remainder of his stay in India, Davis held a succession of more senior positions including Superintendent-General of Police and Justice of the Peace at Calcutta, member of the Board of Revenue and Accountant-General of India. He resigned from the civil service in February 1806 and after a stop at St. Helena to engage in his love for painting, arrived back in England in July the same year.

He was elected a director of the EIC in October at the instigation of President of the Board of Control, Henry Dundas and to the latter's disgust, acted independently thereafter until his death in 1819.

"At the time of the renewal of the [company's] Charter in 1814, the Committee of the House of Commons entrusted him [Davis] with the task of drawing up, in their name, the memorable "Fifth Report on the Revenues of Bengal", which remains a monument of his intimate acquaintance with the internal administration of India"

== Personal life ==
While in Burdwan, Davis married Henrietta Boileau, who was from a refugee French noble family who had come to England in the early eighteenth century from Languedoc in the South of France. She was the first cousin of John Boileau, 1st Baronet of Tacolnestone Hall in Norfolk. The couple went on to have four sons and seven daughters. Their eldest son John Francis Davis, became second Governor of Hong Kong followed by Lestock-Francis and Sullivan, both of whom died in India in 1820 and 1821 respectively. Their daughters were as follows:

- Henrietta-Anne, who married Henry Baynes Ward in 1821.
- Anne, who married Lieutenant-Colonel Henry Dundas Campbell in 1827
- Maria–Jane, who married Lieutenant Colonel John Rivett-Carnac, RN in 1826.
- Elizabeth, who married Sir Henry Willock, KLS.
- Frances, who died in 1828.
- Alicia, who married the Reverend John Lockwood, rector of Kingham in 1832.
- Julia, who in 1839 married John Edwardes Lyall, Advocate-General of Bengal, who died in 1845 of cholera.

== Death ==
Davis died on 16 June 1819 at Birdhurst Lodge near Croydon in Surrey, which is believed to have been his country home.

== Bibliography ==
- Davis, Samuel; Aris, Michael (1982). Views of Medieval Bhutan: the diary and drawings of Samuel Davis, 1783. Serindia.
- Markham, Clements (1876). Narratives of the Mission of George Bogle to Tibet and of the Journey of Thomas Manning to Lhasa. London: Trübner & Co., Ludgate Hill.
