= John Edwardes Lyall =

John Edwardes Lyall (1811 – 6 December 1845) was a British lawyer who was Advocate-General of Bengal.

He was born the eldest son of George Lyall, Member of Parliament for the City of London and was educated at Eton College. His brother was George Lyall, the MP for Whitehaven.

He entered Haileybury College to prepare for the service in the East India Company but instead left Haileybury to go Balliol College, Oxford. Whilst at Oxford he was President of the Oxford Union for Trinity term, 1831. From Oxford he entered the Inner Temple to study law and after practicing in England for some years accepted the post of Advocate-General of Bengal in 1842. There he was popular for his efforts on behalf of the local population, especially on educational matters.

In 1845 he died quite suddenly from cholera when staying at the Governor-General's house at Barrackpore. He had married Julia, the daughter of Samuel Davis of Birdhirst Lodge, Croydon. Their only daughter Maida Henrietta married Alexander S. Creyke, son of the Archdeacon of York.
