= Thomas Hooke Pearson =

British Army general

General Thomas Hooke Pearson CB
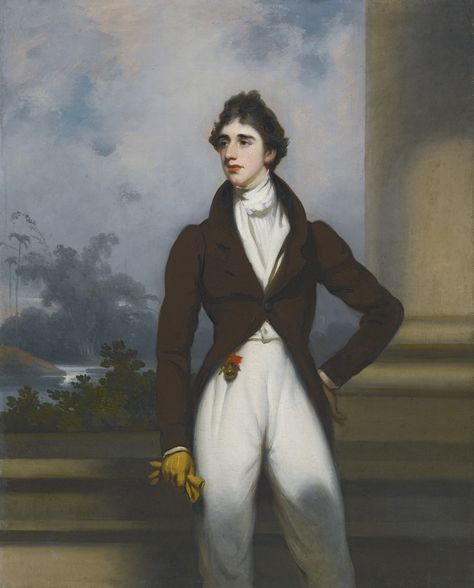
- Born: Thomas Hooke Pearson; 7 June 1806; Tettenhall, Staffordshire, England
- Died: 29 April 1892 (aged 85); Sandy, Bedfordshire, England
- Military career
- Allegiance: United Kingdom
- Branch: British Army
- Service years: 1825–1877
- Rank: General
- Units: 11th Light Dragoons; 59th (2nd Nottinghamshire) Regiment of Foot; 16th The Queen's Lancers
- Commands: 16th The Queen's Lancers
- Conflicts: Siege of Bharatpur; Gwalior campaign; Battle of Maharajpur; First Anglo-Sikh War; Battle of Baddowal; Battle of Aliwal; Battle of Sobraon
- Awards: Companion of the Order of the Bath; Mentioned in Despatches (2x)

General Thomas Hooke Pearson CB (6 June 1806 – 29 April 1892) was a senior British Army general.

== Background and career ==
Pearson was born at Tettenhall, then in Staffordshire, the eldest son of barrister John Pearson (1771–1841), a senior East India Company official who served as Advocate-General of Bengal from 1824 to 1840, and his wife Jane Elizabeth Matilda Hooke (1784–1833). Following his education at Eton College, he was commissioned a cornet in the 11th Light Dragoons on 14 March 1825. That November, he fought at the Siege of Bharatpur under Lord Combermere and was a volunteer from the cavalry at the final assault on the fortress, for which he received a medal.

Promoted lieutenant on 1 August 1826, Pearson was ADC to the Earl Amherst during his visit to Maharaja Ranjit Singh, who presented him with a sword of honour for successfully riding an hitherto unmanageable horse. He subsequently transferred to the 59th (2nd Nottinghamshire) Regiment of Foot, receiving a captaincy in the regiment on 16 August 1831. On 9 December, he became a captain (by exchange) in the 16th The Queen's Lancers. In December 1843, he fought under Sir Hugh Gough at the Battle of Maharajpur during the Gwalior campaign and was again decorated. During the First Anglo-Sikh War, Pearson commanded a squadron at the Battle of Aliwal, commanding his regiment during the later part of that battle and again at the Battle of Sobraon, for which he was twice mentioned in dispatches. He received a brevet majority on 19 June 1846, and became a major (by purchase) on 23 April 1847.

After the war, Pearson saw no further action, and was placed on half-pay with effect from 7 April 1848. He was brevetted to lieutenant-colonel on 20 June 1854 and to colonel on 26 October 1858. He was appointed a Companion of the Order of the Bath (CB) on 2 June 1869. Promoted to major-general on 4 February 1872 (ante-dated to 6 March 1868, with pay from 5 February 1872), he was placed on the retired list on 1 October 1877, with the rank of lieutenant-general (retired) from the same date.

On 4 February 1879, Pearson was appointed colonel of the 12th Lancers. On 1 July 1881, he was granted the honorary rank of general. He died on 29 April 1892, aged 85. His will was proven in London in July 1892 (resworn January 1893), with his estate valued at £36,938 17s. 9d. (equivalent to £4,103,924 in 2025).

== Arms ==
Coat of arms of Thomas Hooke Pearson

Crest
In front of a demi-sun in splendour proper, a parrot's head erased argent, gorged with a collar nebuly azure
Escutcheon
Per fesse nebuly, azure and sable, in chief, two suns in splendour, and in base, issuant from a mount, a sun-flower, stalked and leaved, all proper
Orders
Companion of the Order of the Bath (CB)
