= John Pearson (advocate general) =

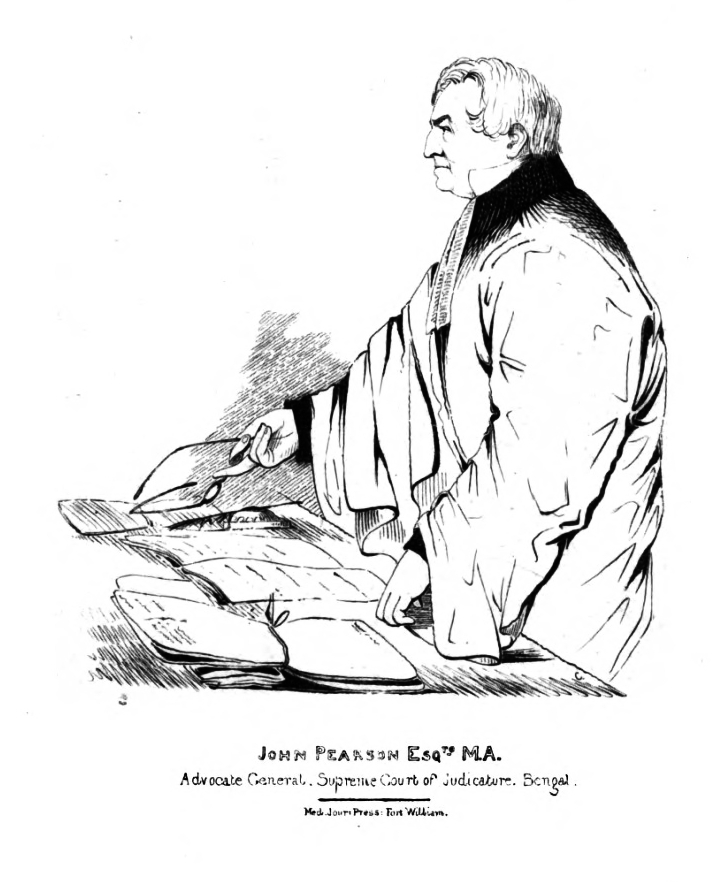
Sketch of Pearson by Colesworthey Grant

John Pearson (25 December 1771 – 16 April 1841) was a British barrister and Advocate-General of Bengal.

== Early life ==
Pearson was the eldest child of Thomas Pearson Esq. (3 May 1732, Tettenhall, Staffordshire – 25 August 1796) and his wife Elizabeth Leake (6 June 1743, Newport, Shropshire – 12 April 1832, Castle Cary, Somerset). He received the earlier education under Rev. Robert Dean and Ref. Mr. Lawson. After graduation from Wolverhampton Grammar School, he matriculated from Christ Church, Oxford on 24 October 1789. He was admitted to Lincoln's Inn on 28 October 1790 and was called to the Bar in 1802.

Pearson married Jane Elizabeth Matilda Hooke on 21 December 1802 and started practice as a barrister at Tettenhall and London.

== Career ==
In April 1824 Pearson came to Calcutta with his family and was appointed as the Advocate-General of Bengal by the East India Company in place of Sergeant Robert Spankie. He was elected by an anonymous vote of East India Board of Directors. Due to ill health, he returned to England in 1840, and died in 1841.

== Personal life ==
On 21 December 1802 at Barwell, Leicestershire, Pearson married Jane Elizabeth Matilda Hooke (14 April 1784, Barwell, Leicestershire – 16 November 1833, Bower Ashton, Somerset), the eldest daughter of Lieutenant-Colonel George Philip Hooke of the 17th Regiment. They had seven children:

1. Elizabeth Mary (23 October 1804, Barwell, Leicestershire – 29 December 1848, Worsley, Lancashire). She first married, at Calcutta, India on 26 April 1825, George Macartney Greville (died at Berhampur, Bengal, India on 26 April 1834). She married secondly, at Hanover Square, London as his second wife, James Loch (7 May 1780 – 28 June 1855). She had children by her first husband.
2. Thomas Hooke (7 June 1806, Tettenhall, Staffordshire – 29 April 1892, Sandy, Bedfordshire). He married and left children.
3. Jane Frances Matilda (8 August 1808, Tettenhall, Staffordshire – 29 August 1887, Coates, Gloucestershire). She married, at Barwell, Leicestershire, on 27 February 1837, Lieutenant (later Lieutenant-General) George William Key (6 February 1812, Coates, Gloucestershire – 20 August 1883, Coates, Gloucestershire), and had children.
4. Hugh (7 November 1809, Tettenhall, Staffordshire – 20 February 1885, Portswood, Hampshire). He married, at Calcutta on 22 June 1837, Jane Augusta Alkinson (26 May 1804, Leeds, Yorkshire – 19 December 1893, Portswood, Hampshire), and had children.
5. Emily (September 1811 – 10 June 1823)
6. George (28 April 1813, Barwell, Leicestershire – 11 January 1838, Hazaribagh, India)
7. Rev. Charles James (31 October 1814 – 10 June 1881, Brislington, Somerset). He married, at Clifton-upon-Dunsmore on 8 December 1845, Mary Charlotte Moor (2 October 1818, Clifton-upon-Dunsmore, Warwickshire – 26 August 1885, Weymouth, Dorset), and had children.
