= Changangkha Lhakhang =

Buddhist temple in Thimphu, Bhutan

- Tibetan transcription(s); Tibetan: ལྕང་བསྒང་ཁ་ལྷ་ཁང་
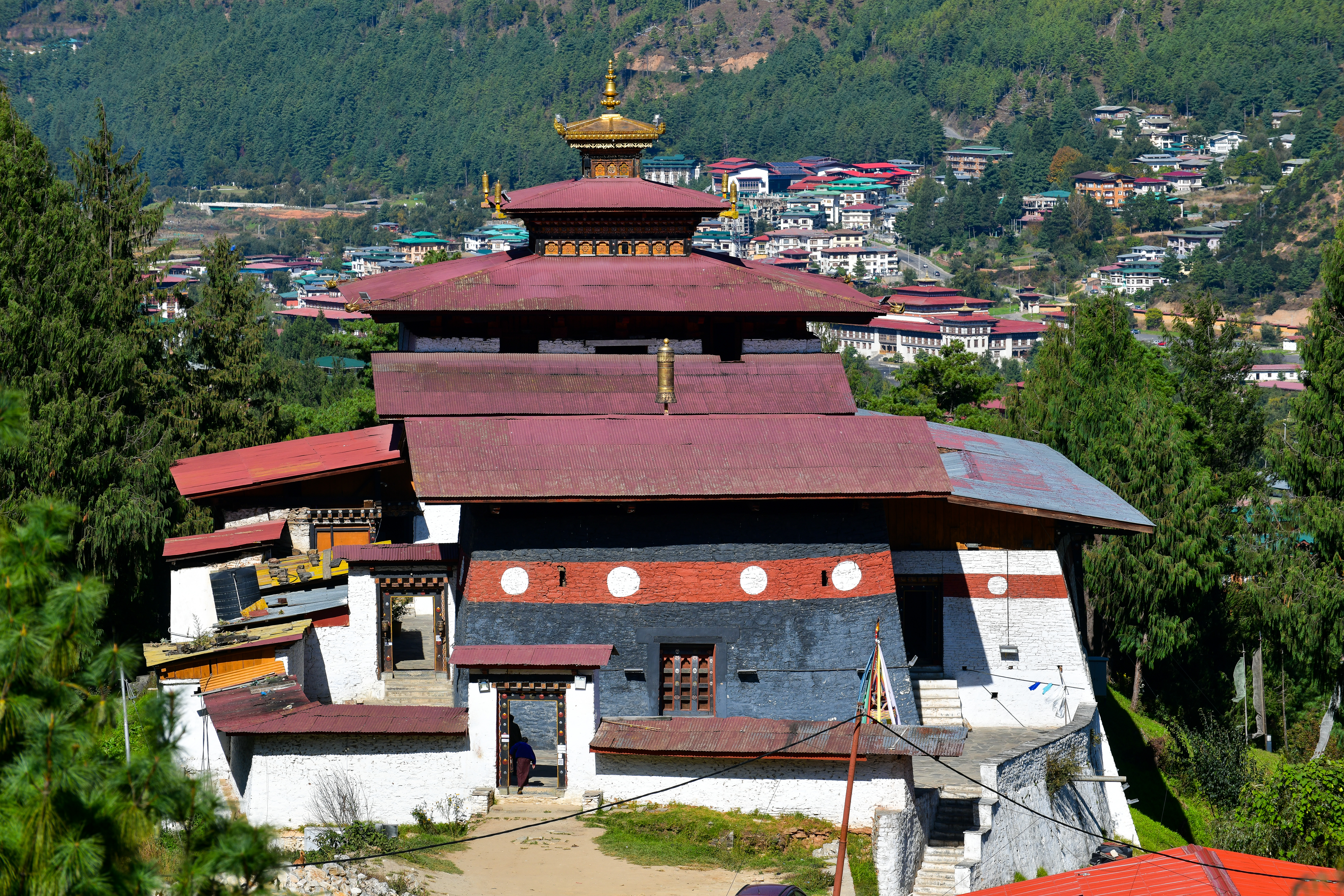
- Changangkha Lhakhang from the west

Religion
- Affiliation: Tibetan Buddhism

Location
- Country: Bhutan
- Interactive map of Changangkha Lhakhang
- Coordinates: 27°28′23.881″N 89°37′41.76″E

Architecture
- Established: 13th century

Changangkha Lhakhang is a compact temple complex located on the tip of a ridge that juts towards central Thimphu from the hills to the east. Founded in the 13th or 14th centuries, it is probably the oldest surviving temple in Thimphu. The main components and foundations of the monastery are extremely old, long predating the unification of Bhutan in the 17th century by Zhabdrung Ngawang Namgyal. The temple is often frequented by parents with small children seeking to obtain blessings from the protective deity of the temple, Genyen Domtsangpa, who is considered to be the birth deity and protector of children born in JDWNRH national referral hospital in Thimphu.

== History ==
Changangkha Lhakhang was founded in the 13th century by Nyima, one of the sons of Phajo Drugom Zhigpo who first introduced the teachings of the Drukpa Kagyu tradition of Himalayan Buddhism to Bhutan, and who is revered as an emanation of Avalokiteśvara, The main object of reverence in the temple is a huge bronze "self-arisen" statue of the Mahakarunika form of Avalokiteśvara (rang byung thugs rje chen po), which is in a seated posture with eleven heads and multiple arms. This was the personal deity of Phajo. Some claim this statue is "self arisen" or miraculously occurring, while others say it was made by an exceptionally skilled and inspired Newa artisan at the time of the construction of the temple.

== Layout ==
Changangkha lhakhang is laid out along the natural ridge as it descends towards Thimphu. At the end of the ridge are two buildings, the main temple to the east (on the Thimphu side), and facing it to the west across a small courtyard, the black Gönkhang (protective deities temple). Other buildings, which house the resident monks and caretakers, are located on the other two sides, together forming a quadrangle. Encircling this temple complex on three sides is a wall enclosing a path used for circumambulation. Small niches containing prayer wheels and relief carvings on slate which depict Buddhas and lamas of the Kagyu lineage, are attached to all sides of the main temple.

The interior of the main temple is divided into two sections.. The east side enshrining the principal sacred images, scriptures and other relics is not usually open to the general public - although the man image can be viewed from the other section, which is also where the lamas of the temple are seated while conducting rituals and prayers. Proper dress and decorum are required when visiting the temple.

Facing the main temple across the courtyard, which also holds a simple outside shrine to a tsömen or "mermaid" spirit, is the Gönkhang or protector temple. This temple is considered to be the residence of Genyen Domtsangpa the fierce protector of children born in Thimphu. It also holds images of other protective deities and the paintings adorning the walls of this temple are the oldest known murals surviving in the country. However entrance to this temple is restricted only to Bhutanese men,

Behind the main temple, descending into the valley towards Thimphu town, there are paths with steps leading through a series of terraces dotted with small stupas or chöten. From these terraces there are panoramic views of Thimphu in three directions.

== Festivals ==
A Tshechu with masked dances is held in the small courtyard on the twelfth, thirteenth and fourteenth days of the ninth Bhutanese lunar month. Annually the large ancient manuscript of the Kangyur (or Buddhist cannon) of over 100 volumes written in gold ink, which is held in the main temple, is recited here in its entirety by gomchens who come here from their meditation centre at Gogona, in the Phobjikha valley.

== Gallery ==
Photographs of Changankha Lhakhang
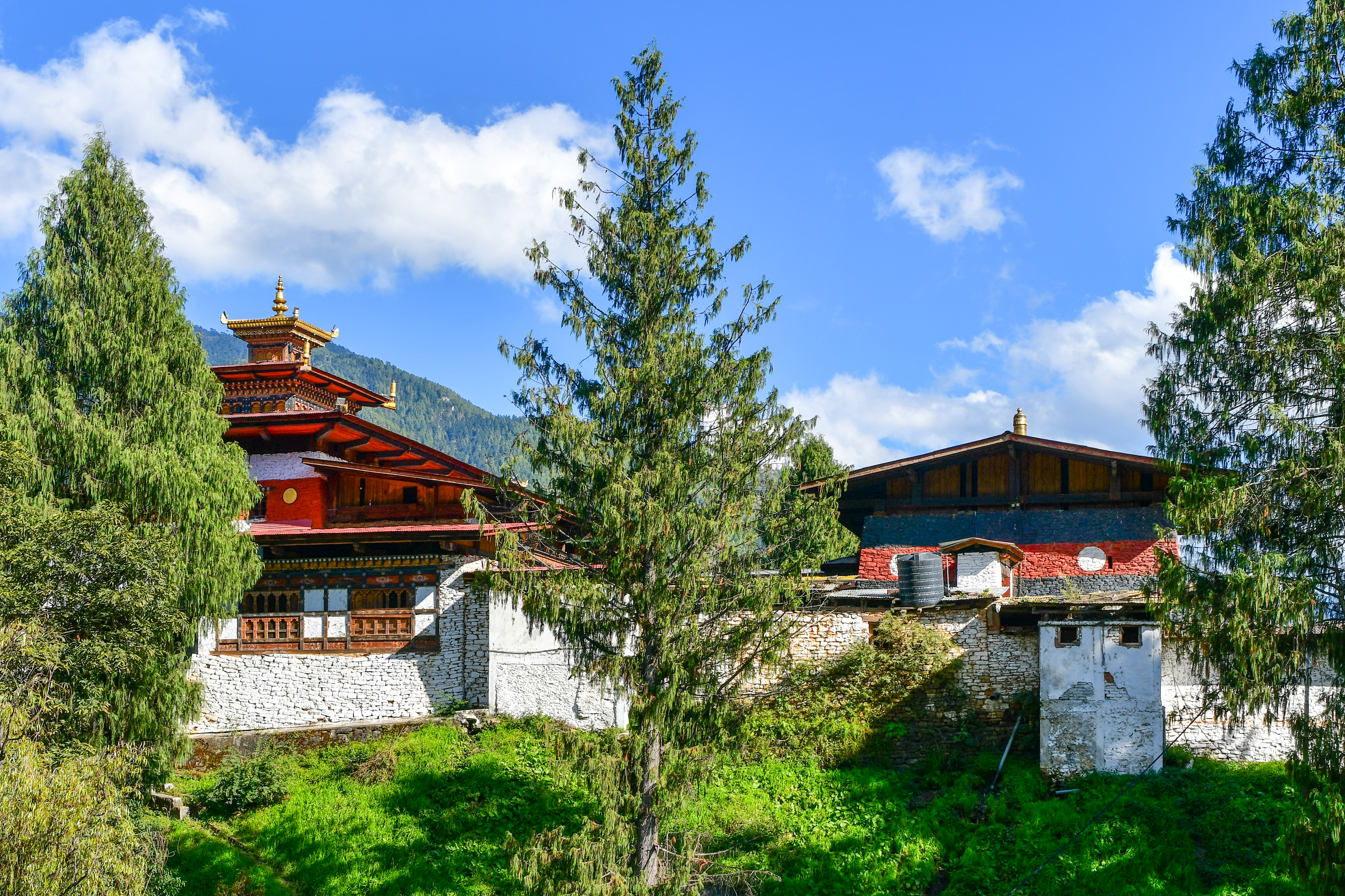
Changangkha Lhakhang from the North side

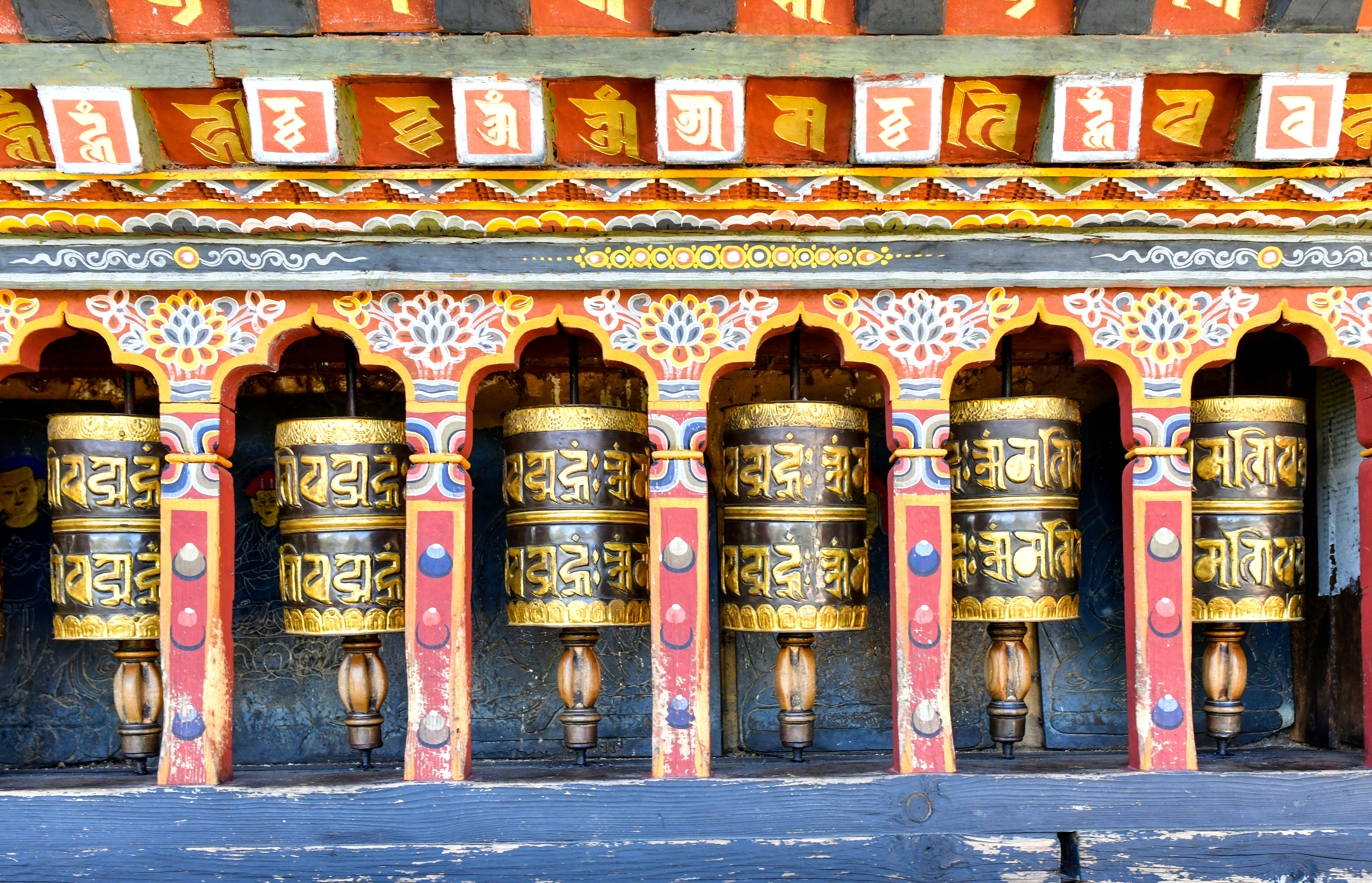
Prayer wheel niches on the walls of the main temple

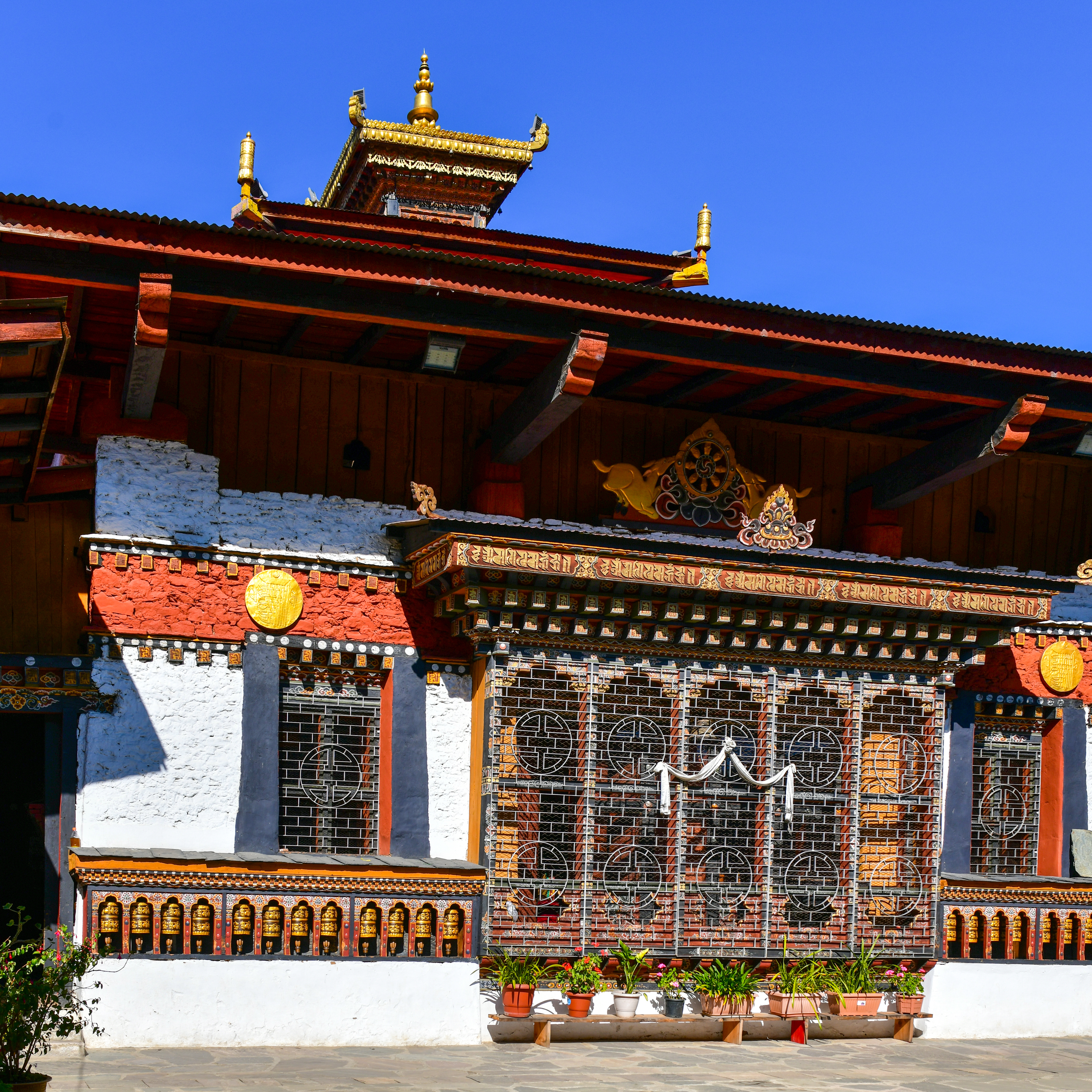
West side of thee main temple facing courtyard

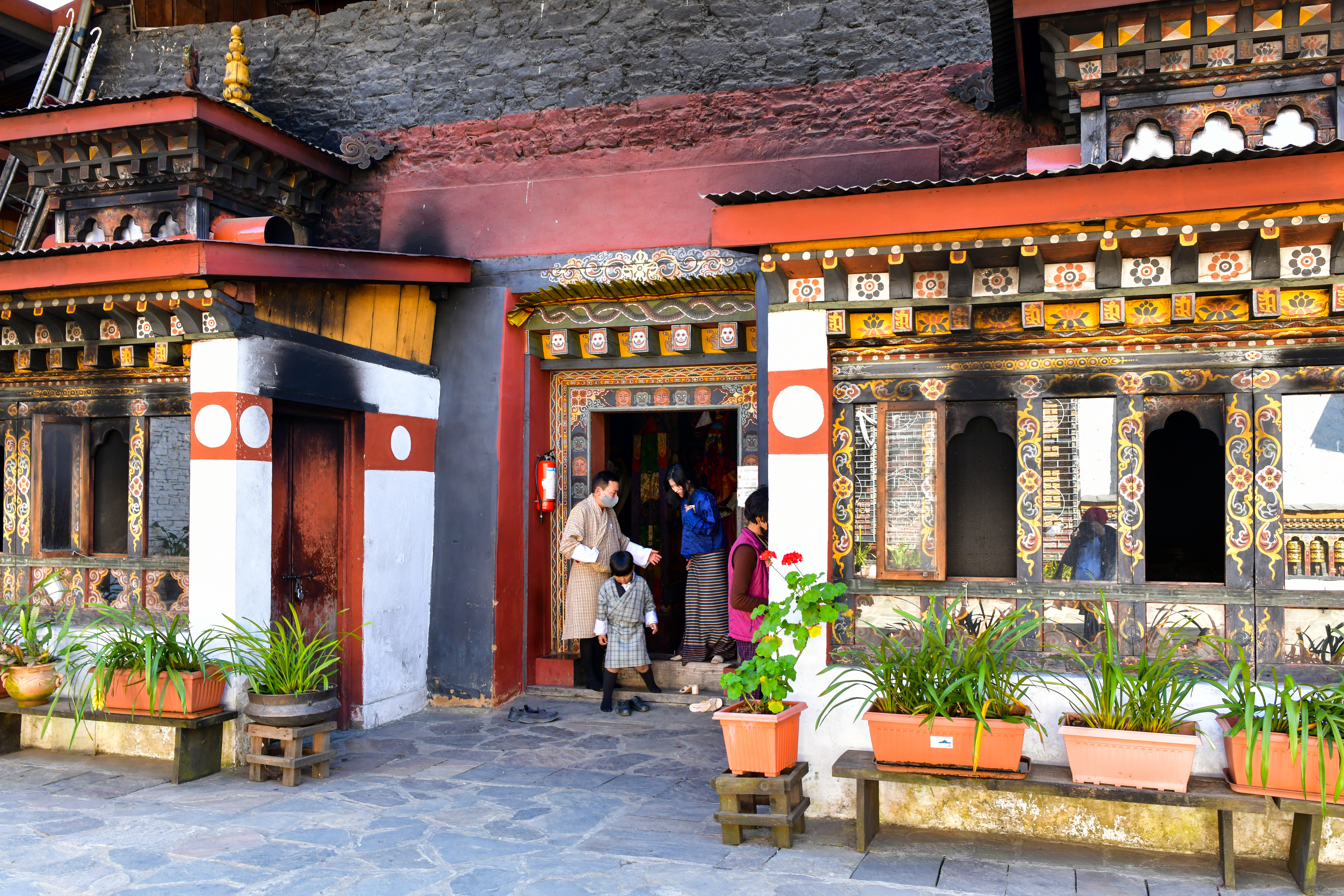
Entrance to protector temple

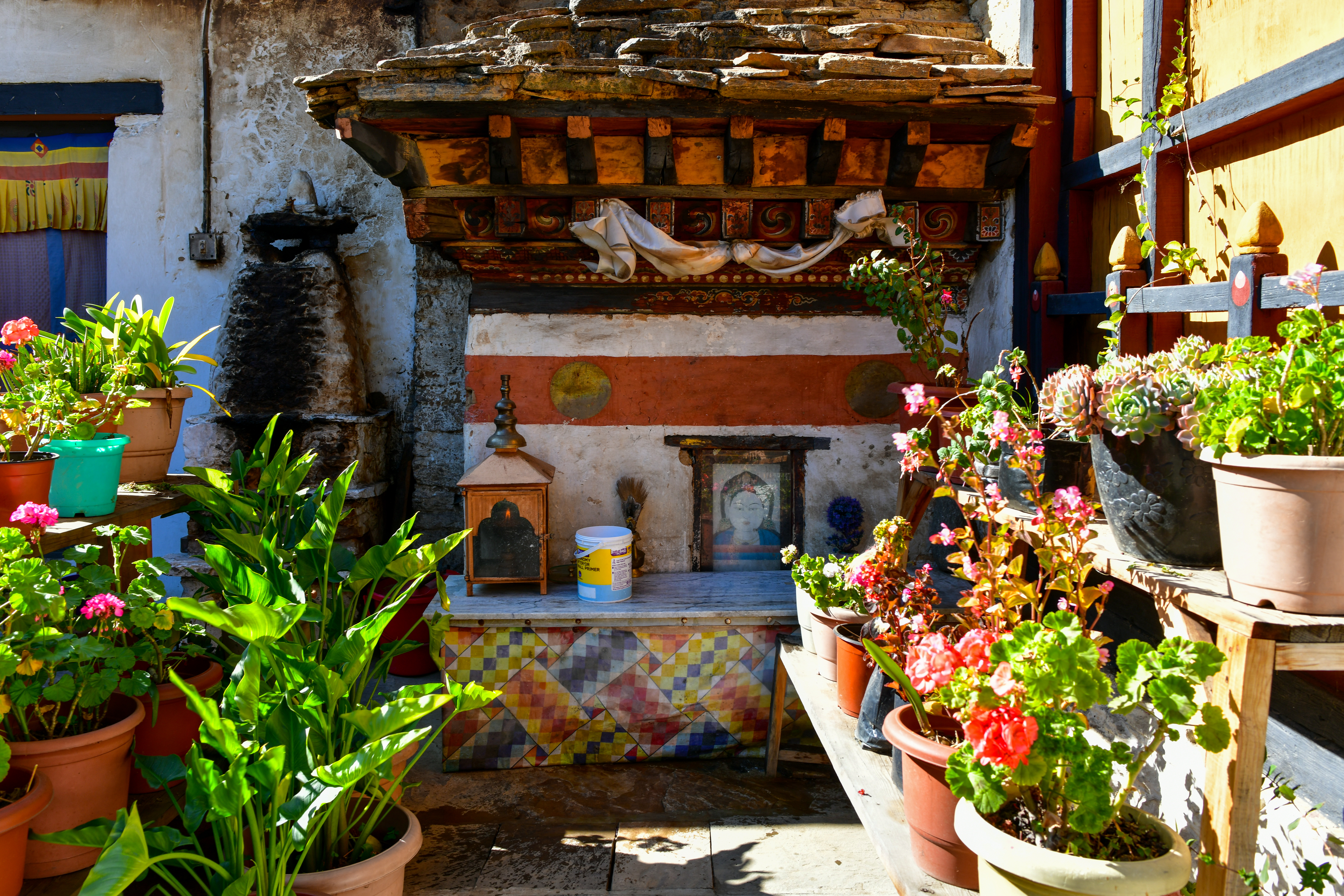
Simple shrine to a Tshömen spirit in the courtyard

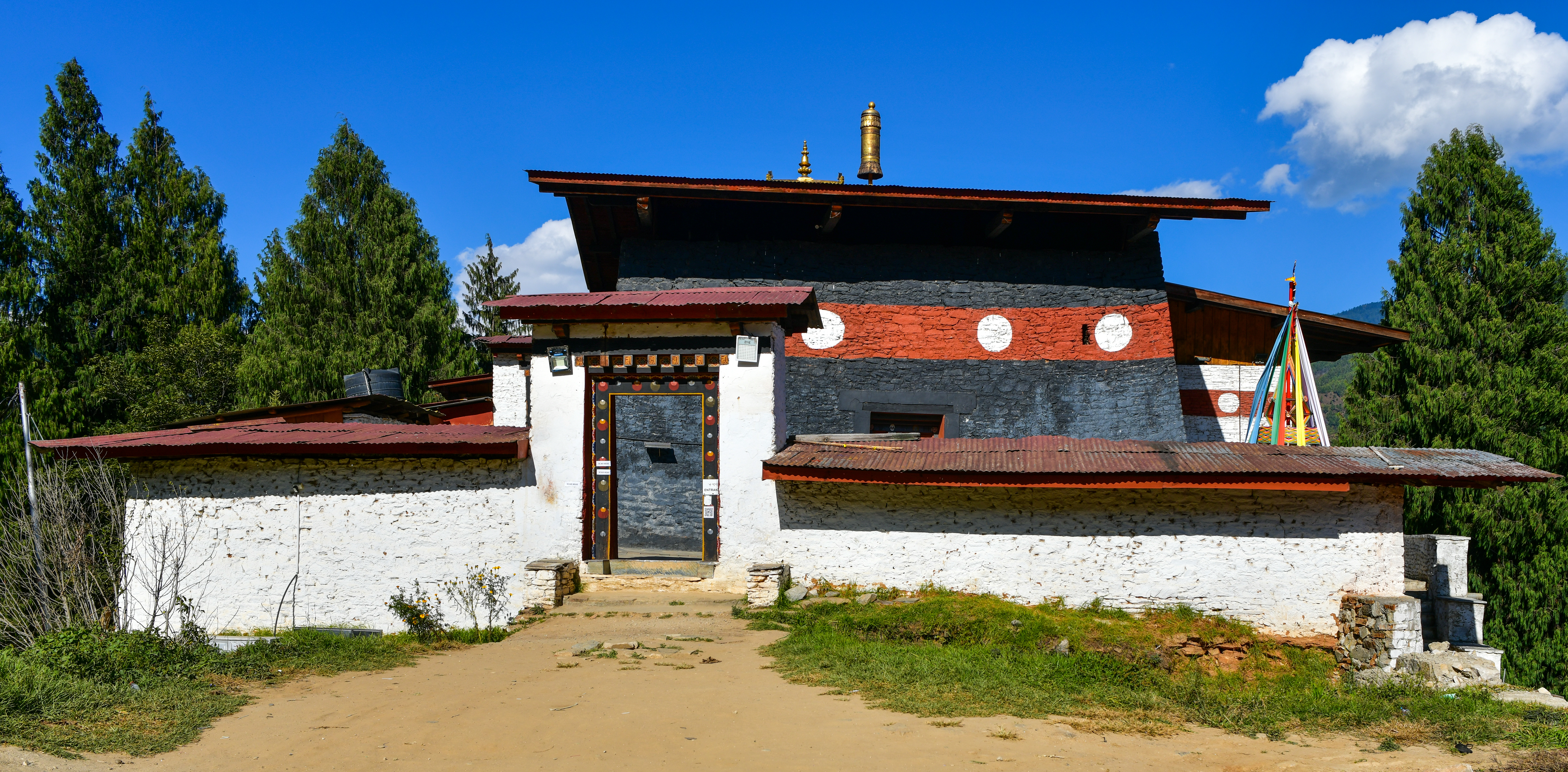
Rear entrance to the temple compound
