= Advocate-General of Bengal =

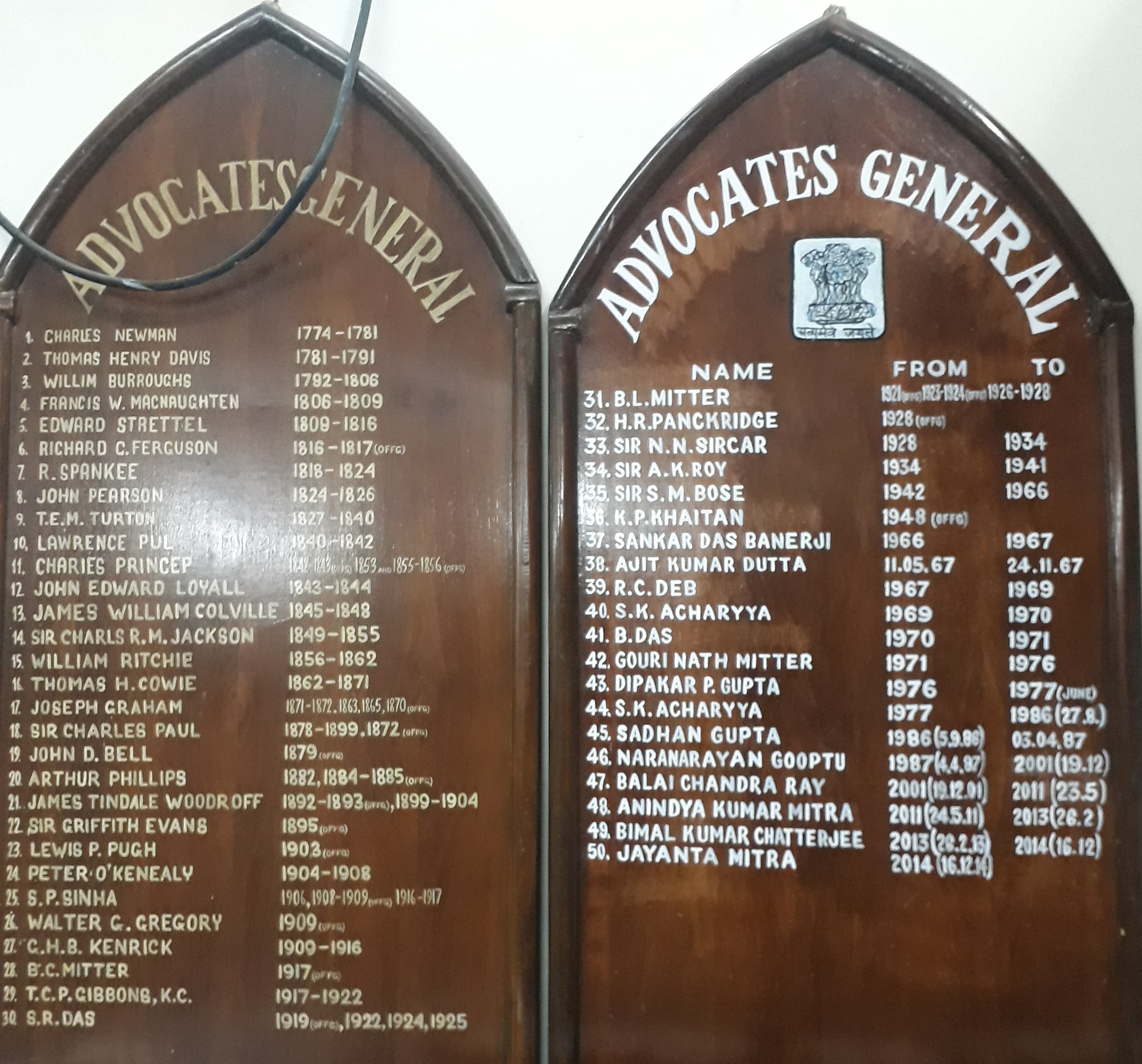
List of Advocate General of Bengal

The Advocate-General of Bengal was charged with advising the Government of the British administered Bengal Presidency on legal matters. The Presidency existed from 1765 to 1947. Prior to 1858, when it was administered by the East India Company, the Advocate-General was the senior law officer of that company but was also the Attorney-General of the Sovereign of Great Britain.

== List of Advocates-General of Bengal ==
East India Company

- Sir John Day 1780–
- Thomas Henry Davies 1786–?1792
- Sir William Burroughs, Bt 1792–1801
- Edward Strettell ?1803–c.1816
- Robert Cutlar Fergusson (acting) c.1817
- Robert Spankie 1817–?1823
- Robert Cutlar Fergusson 1823–
- John Pearson 1824–1840
- (Sir) Lawrence Peel 1840–1842 (afterwards Chief Justice of Bengal, 1842)
- John Edwardes Lyall 1842–?1845 (died of cholera, 1845)
- Sir James William Colvile 1845–1848 (later Chief Justice of Bengal, 1855)
- William Ritchie 1855–1861

Government of the United Kingdom

- Thomas Hardwick Cowie 1862–1870
- Joseph Graham 1870–1873
- Sir Gregory Charles Paul 1873–1899
  - Frederick Joseph Patton 1878 (acting)
  - Arthur Phillips 1882, 1884-1885 (acting)
  - Sir Gruffydd Humphrey Pugh Evans 1895 (acting)
- James Tisdall Woodroffe 1899–1904
- Lewis Pugh Pugh 1900–
- Peter O'Kinealy 1904–
- Satyendra Prasanna Sinha 1908–1909
- George Harry Blair Kenrick 1909–1916
- Satyendra Prasanna Sinha 1916
- Thomas Clark Pilling Gibbons 1917–1923
- Satish Ranjan Das 1922–
- Sir Brojendra Lai Mitter 1925–1928
- Sir Nripendra Nath Sircar 1928–1934
- Sir Asoka Kumar Roy 1934–1943
- Sudhansu Mohan Bose c.1946
