= Bhutan Postal Corporation =

Operation of postal system in Bhutan

Coordinates: 27°28′25.6″N 89°38′19.4″E

Bhutan Postal Corporation Ltd
- Industry: Postal service
- Founded: 1 October 1995
- Headquarters: Thimphu, Bhutanese
- Website: bhutanpost.bt

Bhutan Postal Corporation Ltd, often shortened to simply Bhutan Post, is the company in Bhutan responsible for the operation of the country's postal system.

== History ==
Until 1996 the post in Bhutan was run by the Department of Posts and Telegraphs, part of the Ministry of Communications, but in line with the Government of Bhutan's policy of giving autonomy to organisations able to operate independently, Bhutan Post was created on 1 October 1996. Under the Bhutan Postal Corporation Act 1999 (BPCA), the Directors of the corporation are appointed by the Bhutan government and the chairman is the relevant government minister. Bhutan has been a member of the Universal Postal Union (UPU) since 1969 and in 1983 they joined the Asian-Pacific Postal Union.

== Services ==
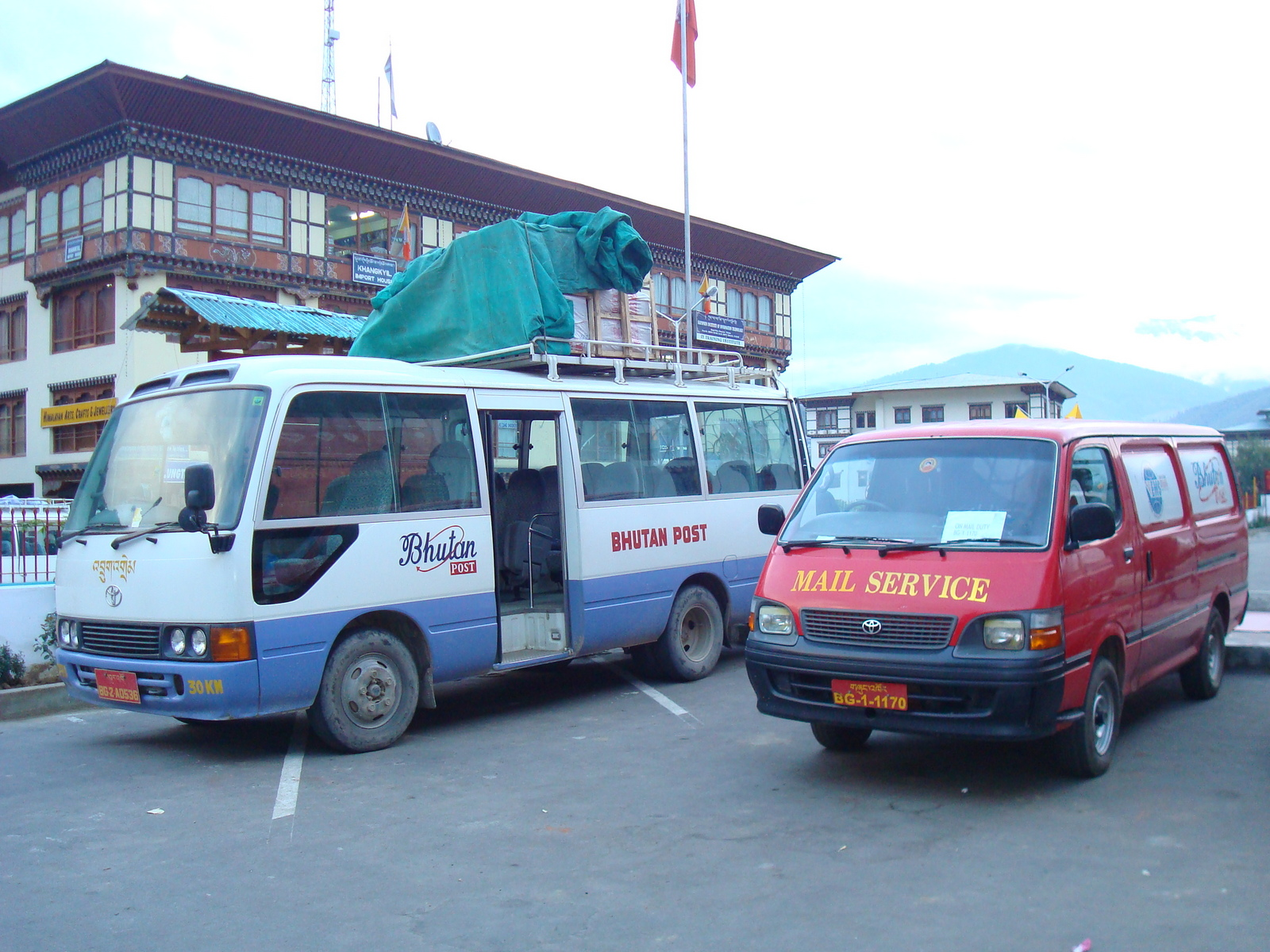
Bhutan Post Mail Express bus and delivery van

The first post office was opened in Phuentsholing on 10 October 1962. The number increased from 3 post offices in 1964 to 33 post offices in 1971, via 72 post offices in 1978 (including branch or agency post offices) to a high 83 post offices in 1988, after which we see a decrease in the full-fledged post offices to 47 in 2006, but with an increase of the agency post offices to 43. The latest figure for 2010 is 43 post offices (including the two General Post Offices in Phuentsholing and Thimphu) and 33 Community Mail Offices, the new name for agency port office. Bhutan Post offers normal letter post services as well as domestic and international express services and a philatelic service. A variety of financial services are provided including money orders and a Western Union service. Under the BPCA 1999, Bhutan Post has a monopoly on the handling of standard letters within the country.

The Bhutan Postal Corporation opened in November 2015 the Bhutan Postal Museum on the groundfloor of the general post office building in Thimphu.

Bhutan Post also operates a transport network within the country and between the border town of Phuntsholing and Kolkata in India, which carries mail and passenger traffic.

== Special stamp issues ==
Bhutan Post had a contract with the Inter-Governmental Philatelic Corporation from 1974 - 1992 to produce a number of special issues a year for sale in the international market for which they received a royalty of up to US$0.110 million annually.

== Postcodes ==
Bhutan Post introduced in 2010 the country's first postcode system set up with assistance of the UPU. The postal codes can be searched on the website of Bhutan Postal Corporation.

== See also ==
- Postage stamps and postal history of Bhutan
