= Arnold C. Waterfall =

British philatelist (1914–1990)

Arnold Cartwright Waterfall (6 May 1914 - 1990) was a philatelist who was a specialist in the stamps of Tibet. He wrote extensive on the subject and his articles appeared in Gibbons Stamp Monthly, the China Clipper, the Collectors' Club Philatelist, the China Philatelic Society Bulletin and The Philatelist. His The postal history of Tibet was written after thirty years of personal research and included the information that some Tibetan stamps were printed using house paint and that soot or boot polish were sometimes used to cancel stamps.

Robson Lowe auctioned his collection of Tibet for £96357 in the 1978/79 season.

== Selected publications ==
- The postal history of Tibet. London: Robson Lowe, 1965. (Revised edition 1981 ISBN 0-85397-199-4)

== See also ==
- Nepal and Tibet Philatelic Study Circle
- Wolfgang Hellrigl
