= Postage stamps and postal history of Bhutan =

1973 Bhutan record stamps. The stamps play the Royal Bhutan Anthem, folk-songs and a short history of Bhutan.

The first postage stamps of Bhutan were issued in 1962, the same year that the first motorable road was opened. Before that there was a mail delivery system in place for official mail using mail runners, and between 1955 and 1962 revenue stamps were accepted as payment for internal mail. With the opening up of Bhutan in the early 1960s, a formal postal system was introduced.

The American entrepreneur Burt Todd assisted in establishing a postage stamp program in the country and Bhutan became known for the unusual designs and materials of its stamps which were chosen by Todd specifically to attract attention. With the assistance of the Indian postal advisor Dr. K. Ramamurti, who was in Bhutan from 1964 to 1968, a proper postal organization and infrastructure was set up under the leadership of a young Bhutanese officer Mr. Lam Penjor, who became the Director of the Department of Posts and Telegraphs.

== History of mail delivery ==
=== Mail before 1955 ===
Prior to 1955 no systematic procedure appeared to have existed for the transmission of mail. In the absence of motorable roads, official mail was sent from one Dzong to another or to one of the royal palaces through special mail runners or casual travelers depending on the urgency. The Thrimpon (chief district court official) of each Dzong was responsible for the transmission of official mail.

=== Dzong Dak system and the use of fiscals as postage ===
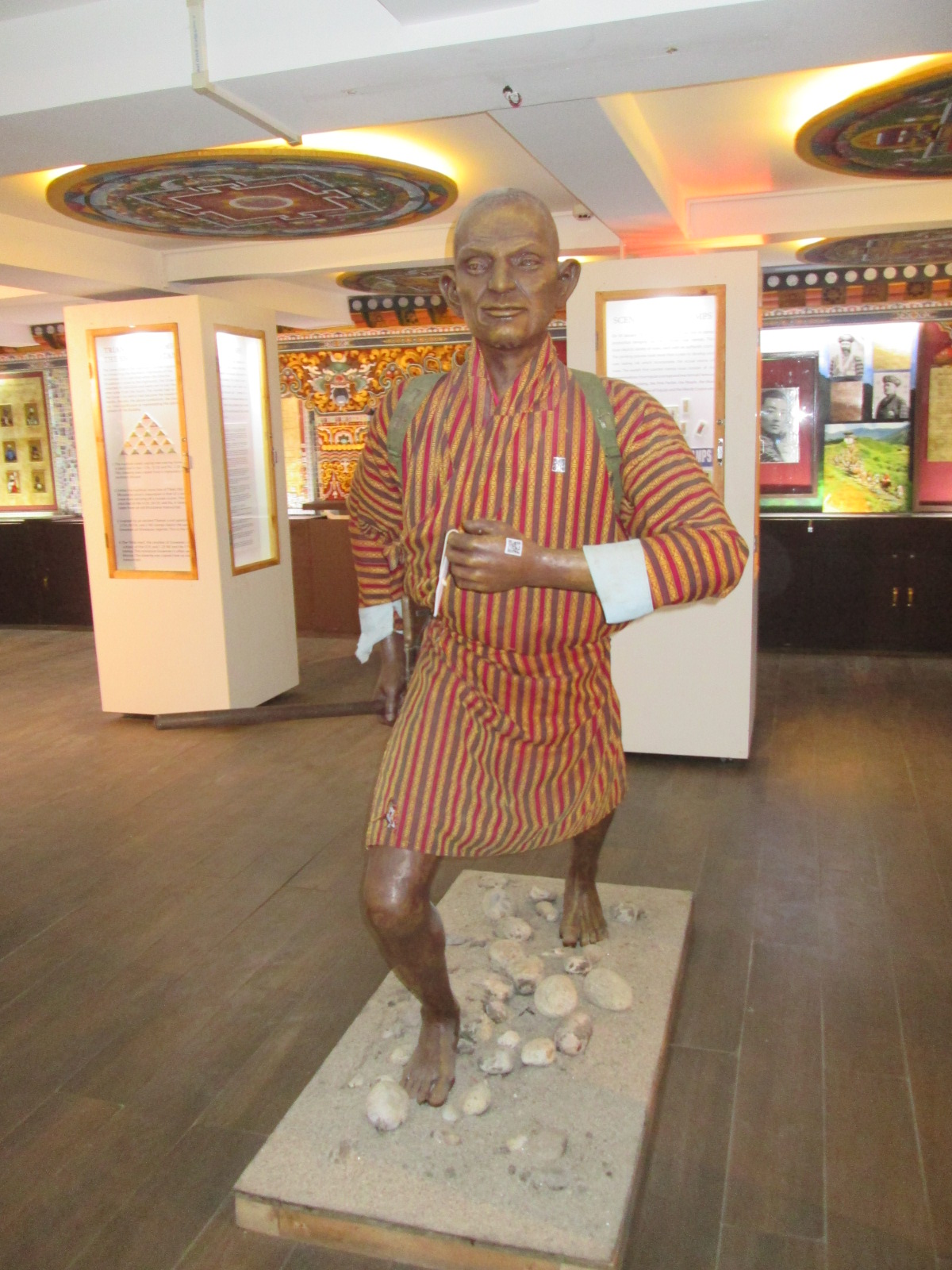
Bhutan Postal Runner as displayed in the Bhutan Postal Museum in Thimphu, Bhutan

In 1955 the Royal Government of Bhutan regularized the dispatch of mail from various government offices at intervals of five days, and placed it on a monetary footing because the system was being stretched thin through growing private use for personal mail. The fiscal revenue stamps, which had been introduced the year before, had to be used as proof of pre-payment for the services, except that mail that pertained to the King, was permitted to be carried without these stamps affixed. This mail runner system is colloquially referred to as the "unstoppable wheel" and philatelically as the Dzong Dak system (dak means 'post' or 'mail' in Hindi).

The system existed mostly for Bhutan domestic purposes (including mail to Bhutanese exclaves near Mount Kailash (Tibet), to Bhutan House at Kalimpong, India as well as to the Bhutan Trade Agent at Lhasa). To foreign destinations, mail matter prepaid in Bhutan with fiscal stamps was carried by Dzong runners, at first to the Indian post office in Yatung, Tibet and after the hand-over of the Indian postal installations in Tibet to China in April 1955, to the Chinese post office which succeeded the Indian post office there.

Additional postage of the country operating the post office was affixed for onward carriage. Most of the known covers sent via this route were destined for the Bhutanese representation in Kalimpong, India, known as Bhutan House. However, covers to private people and people c/o the post office in Kalimpong are known, as are covers to more far flung locations in India, Nepal, the UK and the US. A few covers without additional stamps of other countries are known to have made it to their destinations in the US. Generally, on items going abroad, the fiscal stamps appear affixed at the upper left of the dual franked covers, with space left at the upper right where eventually the Indian or Chinese stamps purchased at Yatung were placed, resulting in mixed franking. Some covers have the added postage on the backsides. Although disputed, the Finnish philatelist Iiro Kakko opines that the majority of the known covers sent to Kalimpong appear not to be genuine letters routed through the postal system, but especially produced for the philatelic market.

=== Start of the modern era ===
Plans for issuing Bhutan's own postage stamps as a source of revenue for Bhutan was first suggested to the Bhutanese authorities by Sir Basil John Gould, the British-Indian political officer for Sikkim, Bhutan and Tibet from 1936 to 1945. In the mid 1950s this was successfully discussed again with the Ministry of Foreign Affairs of India, together with plans to join the UPU and the required modern postal system needed for becoming a member of this international organisation. India was willing to assist Bhutan in these stated desires. The need for a modern postal system was accelerated by the start of development programs in Bhutan and the end of its self-imposed isolation in the late 1950s and early 1960s. There was a sizeable increase of correspondence in English and the number of mail items, now also including Indian newspapers and periodicals for the staff managing schools and development projects. The Dzong mail service was not able to cope with the significant increase of mail items and its staff could in general not read English. In the first Five Year Plan launched in 1961 the set-up of a postal service was among the proposed development activities. A Posts & Telegraphs Department was established under the Ministry of Communications and the first regular post office was opened in the border town of Phuentsholing on 10 October 1962, when also the first postage stamps were issued. The decision of the Kingdom to issue postage stamps has been described also as its first assertion of its international personality.

== Postage stamps and modern postal history ==
=== 1962–1974: Burt Todd and the Bhutan Stamp Agency ===
A postal system was created with the gradual opening of more post offices and postal agencies. Gradually the postal runners who were plying the off-road routes, would come under the control of the Posts & Telegraphs Department, and no longer be part of the Dzong administration. Foreign mail was routed through India by a bilateral agreement, as only on 7 March 1969 did Bhutan become a member of the Universal Postal Union (UPU) and the Asian-Pacific Postal Union (APPU). The postage stamps were initially designed and printed under an arrangement with Burt Kerr Todd, who also handled their sale to the international market. Burt Todd (1924–2006), an American businessman from Pittsburgh, was instrumental in the start of Bhutan's stamp issuing program. He learned of Bhutan while studying at Oxford University, visited the country in 1951, and became an adviser to the Bhutan government and royal family. He has been credited with being the first American to visit Bhutan although that claim cannot be proven for certain. Already on this first visit Burt Todd was asked by the Bhutanese authorities to explore the printing of their own postage stamps and joining the UPU. The Bhutan stamp program was set up specifically to raise money for the improvement of Bhutan's infrastructure after the country was refused a loan from the World Bank. Todd set up the Bhutan Stamp Agency in Nassau, Bahamas. He had little grasp of how stamps were marketed through the philatelic trade and therefore relied on unusual designs such as 3D printing to attract publicity.

At first ignored by many collectors, some early Todd stamps have become cult items. He produced the world's first 3D stamps using lenticular printing, relief and sculptural stamps, as well as stamps printed on silk or even steel foil, a set of scented rose stamps, and the famous Talking Stamps, miniature records which could be played on a normal record player.

The focus of Burt Todd on the international market left the P&T Department with too few lower-value stamps for the local mail. On advice of the Indian postal advisor to Bhutan, Dr. K. Ramamurti, P&T issued a series of surcharged stamps released in 1965, which were overprinted at the India Security Press in Nashik. The same printer was used by P&T next year 1966 for the first regular, low value, non-agency definitives with the local theme of Bhutanese dzongs. Another complaint by P&T was that often the Bhutan Stamp Agency designed and printed postage stamps without any or enough discussion or approval. After the death in 1972 of the 3rd Druk Gyalpo, His Majesty Jigme Dorji Wangchuck, a good friend of Todd, one of the changes which took place was the cancellation of the contract of the Bhutan Stamp Agency end March 1974.

In recent years, Bhutanese stamps have tended to be more conventional with just the occasional unusual format. Miniature sheets and highly topical subjects remain the staple of the program.

=== 1974–1996: Department of Posts & Telegraphs and the IGPC ===
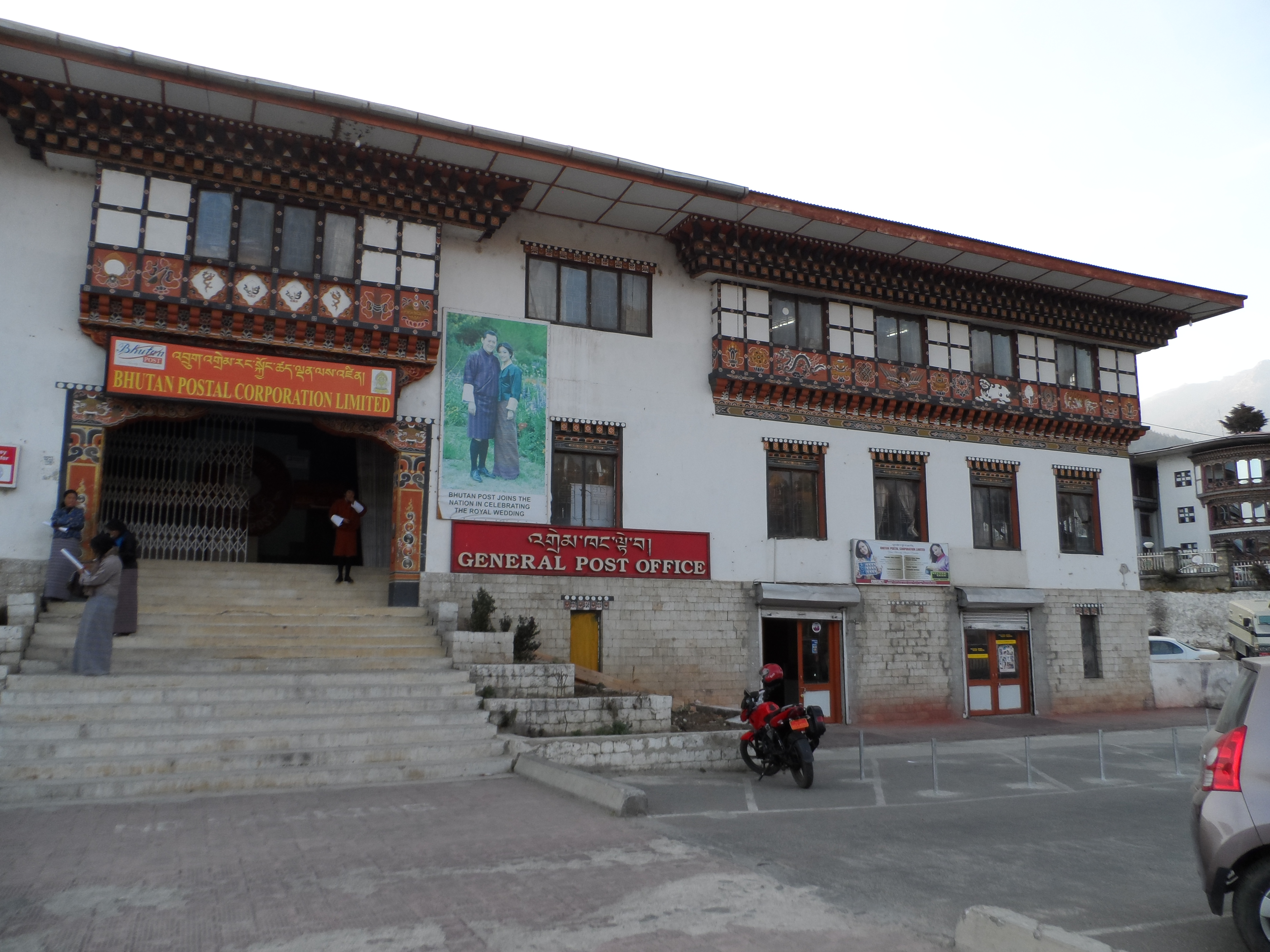
General Post Office in the Bhutanese capital Thimphu

With the departure of Todd, the Department of Posts & Telegraphs appointed the Inter-Governmental Philatelic Corporation (IGPC), based in New York, as its sole, worldwide agent that permitted IGPC to design and print stamps against a royalty. During the IGPC time, at least two issues would bear the legacy of Burt Todd: the gold coins of 1975 and the 3D traditional masks series of 1976. Otherwise their issues would show the typical IGPC staple of thematic and commemorative sets and souvenir sheets, in general hardly related to the country of issue and with the use of high face-value stamps with no local postal usage. Furthermore, the sales income from IGPC decreased dramatically since mid 1986.

Therefore, in 1992 the P&T Department introduced a system of philatelic agents for worldwide marketing and sales. The P&T started to issue topical and commemorative stamp series independently. International agents or organizations can make proposals to issue postage stamps, which upon agreement may be issued against a royalty. IGPC would be one of them and keep a contract for the production of postal stamps until at least the year 2004.

One particular initiative of the P&T Department after the introduction of this new policy was the release in May 1993 of the Famous Paintings - Reading & Writing issue, originally designed and printed by the Bhutan Stamp Agency to commemorate the 100th Anniversary of the UPU (1874–1974) and prepared by the agency to be issued in late 1974. However, the termination of their contract intervened, while the stamps had been already shipped to Bhutan. Since their arrival in the country, the stamps were kept in customs storage and reportedly forgotten by the P&T Department until the early 1990s.

On 14 February 1982 Bhutan joined the Asian-Pacific Postal Union (APPU). With the introduction of Druk Air services between Bhutan, India and Thailand in 1991, mail no longer needed to be routed only overland via Phuentsholing to India, but could also directly be exchanged with the postal exchange offices of New Delhi, Kolkata and Bangkok.

=== 1996–present: Bhutan Postal Corporation ===
In the 7th Five Year Plan (1992–1997) privatization of businesses directly ran by the government was one of the major objectives. Some, however would, because of strategic or practical reasons, remain under government control. These enterprises would, however, be provided with a management structure and operating framework that encourages efficiency whilst ensuring that they operate in the national interest. As a result, the postal and telegraph activities of the P & T Department were incorporated in an autonomous corporation, the Bhutan Postal Corporation Ltd., with its trade name Bhutan Post, as of 1 October 1996.

== Postage stamps review ==
=== Stamp subjects ===
From the start onwards, the issue of postage stamps balanced between two goals, to introduce Bhutan to the world community and to provide revenue, in particular foreign exchange. We will find this reflected in the faces on the stamps: at one side Bhutanese themes and at the other side typical international thematic and commemorative subjects appealing to the philatelic market. The first stamp manager, Burt Todd, added to the latter goal with great success, and often as world's first, special materials (steel foil, silk, gold color metal foil, molded plastic), special shapes (round, triangular), special printing (3D) and special effects (perfumed ink, real playable gramophone recordings). During Todd's period the balance between Bhutanese and general themed stamp subjects was still quite even, but this would change drastically during the IGPC period in favor of world thematic and commemorative themes.

Stamp issued in 2009 on the occasion of the new Punakha Dzong bridge

Bhutanese themes on postage stamps are the nation's royalty, Dzong architecture, Buddhist heritage, the Bhutanese mail service (the postal runner in particular), traditional crafts, antiques, Bhutanese scenes, hydro- power, and the nation's wildlife and sport. Bhutanese themed sport stamps have been issued on the occasion of the Olympics and soccer World Cups. A sample of the theme on Bhutanese architecture is the Expo 2000 issue depicting six different dzongs in Bhutan, Trashigang, Lhuentse, Gasa, Punakha, Tashichhodzong and Paro.

Embossed gold foil coin stamps showing different Kings of Bhutan were issued in 1966 and 1968 and, square-shaped, in 1975. Perfume-infused rose stamps were issued in 1973. Embossed, thin carton stamps depicting paintings were issued in 1970 and 1972. Regular stamps with paintings as a theme were issued in 1987 (combined with sculptures), 1989 (Titan), 1990 (Hiroshige), 1991 (Rubens), 191 (Van Gogh), 1993 (the not earlier released issue of 1974), 1999 (Hokusai) and 2003 (Japanese Art).

The first 3D stamp issues were released in 1967 depicting Astronauts and Lunar Modules. In 1968 a Butterflies 3D stamp issue and in 1969 a Fishes 3D, a Birds 3D and Insects 3D stamps issues were released. Other 3D issues are Paintings (1970), Animals (1970), Conquest of Space (1970 and 1971), Antique Automobiles (1971), Mushrooms (1973) and, at last a Bhutanese motive, Ceremonial Masks (1976). Unique molded plastic 3D stamps were released of Ancient Artifacts in 1971 and of Famous Men in 1972. Other famous people which have appeared on Bhutan Stamps including Elvis Presley (2003), Princess Diana (1982, 2003), Gandhi (1969, 1972, 1997, 2019), John F. Kennedy (1972, 2002), Queen Elizabeth (2002), Mother Teresa (1998) and Albert Einstein (2000).

The famous "silk" stamps (actually printed on rayon) issued in 1969 show Buddhist Prayer Banners or Thangkas. The philatelic world was shocked in 1973 with the self-adhesive Record Stamps or Talking Stamps, which could be played as a gramophone record, playing Bhutanese folk songs and providing a spoken short history of the Kingdom.

Bhutanese themed commemorative issues are among others Admission to the UPU (1969), Bhutan Admission to the UN (1971), Coronation of King Jigme Singye Wangchuck (1975), 30th Anniversary Bhutan Postal Service (1992), 350th Anniversary of Victory over Tibet-Mongol Army (1994), 25th Anniversary of the Coronation of King Jigme Singye Wangchuck (1999), 100 Years of Monarchy (2008), Coronation King Jigme Khesar Namgyel Wangchuck (2008), Visit to Bhutan of Indian Prime-Minister Manmohan Singh (2008), the 35th Anniversary of WFP in Bhutan (2009), Royal Wedding (2011), Golden Jubilee Bhutan Post 1962–2012 (issued with delay in 2013).

Since 1993, Bhutan has released annual Chinese New Year stamps. Animals and flowers appear often on Bhutanese stamps. Disney stamps were issued in 1982, 1984 (2 issues), 1985 (2 issues), 1988, 1989 and again in 1991.

On the occasion of 100 Years of Monarchy did Bhutan Post release in 2008 the world's first CD-ROM postage stamps in partnership with Creative Products International, a company headed by Frances Todd Stewart, the daughter of the legendary Burt Todd. The 2nd CD-ROM stamp was issued the following year.

=== Personalized stamps ===
Bhutan personalized stamp sheet (unused template) on the occasion of the 2011 Royal Wedding

The first personalized stamps template sheet was issued by Bhutan Post on 6 November 2008 on the occasion of the coronation of King Jigme Khesar Namgyel Wangchuck that day, while at the same time the celebrations were held for 100 years of monarchy in Bhutan. The sheet carries the text Coronation and Centenary Celebrations 2008. The total face value is Nu. 120, three rows of four stamps each, respectively with the face value of Nu. 5, Nu. 10 and Nu 15. Each stamp is framed, which provides a blank space for the printing of a personalized picture, drawing or logo. Bhutan Post used these 2008 Coronation and Centenary Celebrations personalized stamp sheets to issue 3 different sheets with pictures of the 4th and 5th (present) King and a stylized illustration of the Raven Crown. These stamps are listed in the Michel catalogue under nos. 2517 - 2528. As personalized stamps were apparently a big success, the issue was followed by further personalized stamp issues, the first two with the same values totaling Nu.120, but different designs. The second sheetlet issued in 2009 carries the text Greetings from the Himalayan Kingdom of Bhutan, while the third issue of early 2011 states From the Land of the Thunder Dragon. On the occasion of the Royal Wedding in October 2011 a set of two personalized stamp sheetlets were issued, both with exactly the same design and stamp values, but for one the main color is orange, while for the second this is dark blue. The sheetlet bears the text Celebrating Royal Wedding 2011, while there is a picture of the newlywed couple as well. The face value of each of the four stamps in the three rows are from top to bottom, Nu.10, Nu.15 and Nu.20, so a total value of Nu.180. Further sheetlets with different designs were issued in 2013, 2015, 2016, 2017, 2018 and 2x in 2019.

=== Postal postage labels ===
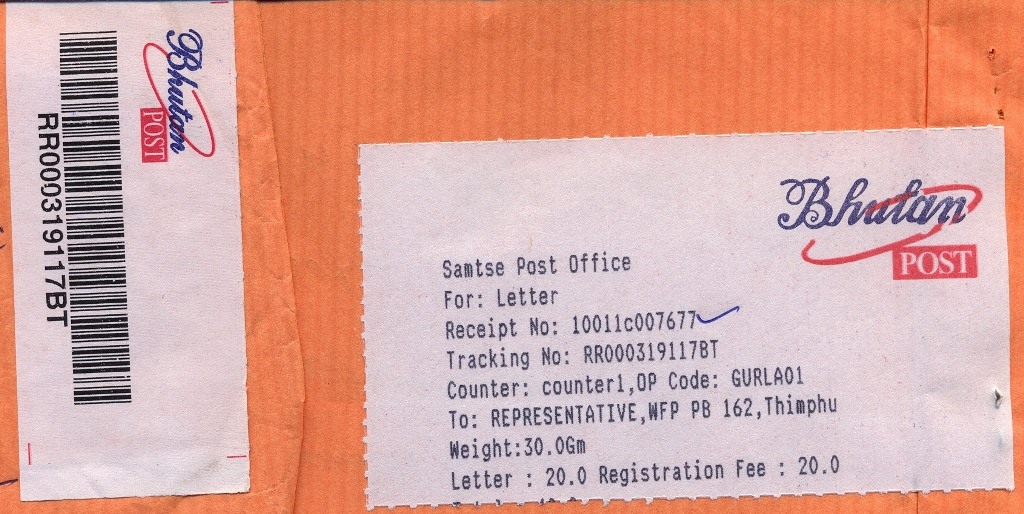
Postal Label for domestic registered mail in Bhutan with separate registration bar code label

Bhutan Post uses postage labels for both regular and registered letters, and Express Mail Service (EMS). All postage labels will indicate date and time, the sending post office, place of addressee, weight of envelope, and costs of postage. EMS and registered letters also indicate name of receiver, EMS or registration tracking number and the registration fee. Registered letters and domestic EMS letters using a postal label, will also have a separate registration or EMS label with a 13-digit reference number and corresponding bar-code, while for international EMS covers this is part of the main label. Registered letters using ordinary postage stamps, will have an analog registration number, often written by hand on the envelope.

== Revenue, legal and non-judicial stamps ==
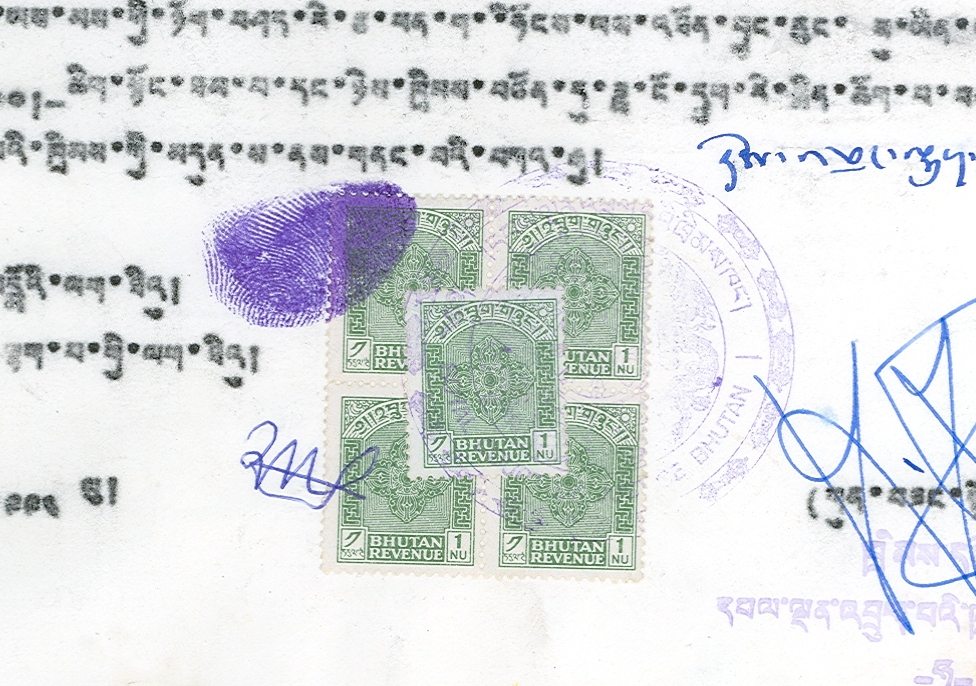
Bhutanese revenue stamps of the 1950s used on a legal document

Bhutan has issued revenue stamps in 1954, 1966/1967 and 1996. The first release consisted of four revenue stamps issued in 1954 in four face values: 1, blue; 2, red, 4, green and 8, orange, but remarkably without any specific currency indicated on the stamps. The stamps were printed in 1949 by Harrison and Sons in London. These stamps were also made valid for postage as of 1 January 1955 (see above "Dzong Dak system and the use of fiscals as postage") until the introduction of the postage stamps in 1962, although they appear to have been postally used until at least 1964. The set has been reprinted in the 1950s on paper that varies from the first printing in 1949, while also the colour ink may differ. A surcharged issue on the blue 1 revenue stamp had been reportedly released in 1961 or 1962, diagonally surcharged respectively with "10NP" and "25NP" (NP standing for New Paisa, so using the Indian currency), but identified as fakes originating from Kathmandu, Nepal. Only in 1966 was a new set of two revenue stamps ready for release, now in Bhutanese currency, of 10 Chetrum (red colour) and 25 Chetrum (jade colour). They were released the next year, followed shortly after by the values 20 Chetrum, 1 Ngultrum and 5 Ngultrum. They were printed at the well-known Nasik Security Press in Nasik, India. In the early 1970s the 10 CH revenue stamp was surcharged officially to 15 CH using a purple rubber seal.

On 12 January 1996 the Ministry of Finance issued a new revenue stamp (Nu 1, red), three non-judicial stamps (Nu 10, brown; Nu 100, purple and Nu 500, pink) and four judicial stamps (Nu 5, green; Nu 20, blue; Nu 50, orange and Nu 100, yellow). There is still a considerable lack of documentation and information for a complete overview of in particular revenue stamps.

== Postal stationery ==
Postal stationery has been produced in the form of postal cards, including picture postal cards, aerograms, inland letter sheets and -only once- a stamped envelope. Without imprinted stamps, covers have been issued for registered letters, while picture postcards are still being produced at present by Bhutan Post.

=== Postal cards ===
The very first postal stationery issued was a picture postal card in 1966 showing on the left back side an etched drawing of Rinpung Dzong (Paro Dzong) while the preprinted postage stamp of 6 Chhetrum shows a drawing of Simtokha Dzong, in the same style and dark green color. This left the front side free for writing of a message.

The next year P&T issued a simple, single postal card with a purple 10 Chhetrum imprinted stamp showing crossed dorjis or vajras. At the same time a reply post card pair was released as well with the same crossed dorjis imprinted stamps. This reply pair had the size and dimensions of two combined single postcards. Furthermore, that year a set of 10 postcards was released, each postcard showing on the front a drawing of a different dzong or lhakhang, each in a different, single color, drawn in a light, modern style. The set was stapled together with a single metal staple and an off-white paper cover on top with the words "Dzong Series", "10 Post Cards" and "His Majesty's Govt. of Bhutan" printed on it in capital letters. These postcards are in principle an overprint on the single postal card, carrying the same imprint of a purple, crossed dorjis 10 Chhetrum stamp.

These picture cards were the first true picture cards of Bhutan, in the sense that the front side was completely used for the drawing, leaving the left side of the divided back open for a message and the right side with the imprinted stamp and address lines, as we are used to in a typical standard picture card lay-out. This would be the last postcard with pre-printed postage for 21 years until 2008 when the "color-your-own-stamp" set of postcards with a 20 Ngultrum imprinted stamp was published.

==== The Free Post picture cards of February 2008 ====
At the occasion of the 28th birthday of the Fifth King, the Bhutanese newspaper Kuensel published as a supplement in their paper on 20 February 2008 a set of 7 carton pages with each 4 post cards on them, so 28 different postcards in all, which in partnership with Bhutan Post could be posted for free the next three days (21, 22 and 23 February 2008) to destinations within Bhutan. The postcards had to be cut out of the pages. The pictures show the 5th King in different poses and occasions, and each one was sponsored by a ministry, a para-statal or a private company. All are in color, except for the one sponsored by Bhutan Post, which is in black and white.

==== The Color-Your-Own picture postal cards of June 2008 ====
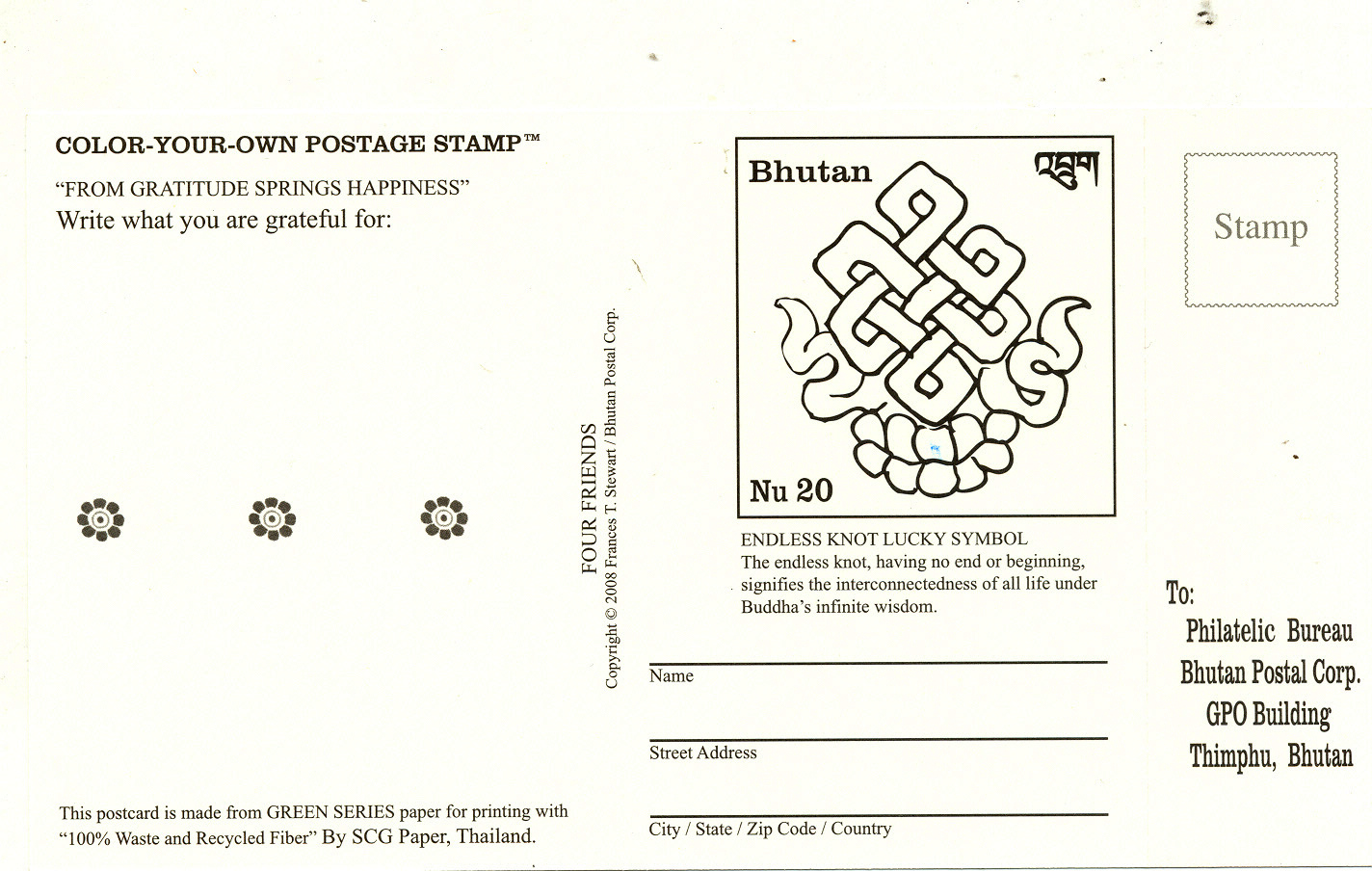
Postcard with imprinted Color Your Own Postage Stamp showing a stylized Endless Knot

On the occasion of the participation of Bhutan to the Smithsonian Folklife Festival (25 June – 6 July 2008) in Washington, DC, Bhutan Post issued a set of four postcards with imprinted "Color Your Own" postage stamps in partnership with Frances Todd Stewart, daughter of the legendary Burt Todd, and Stewart's Creative Products International, creator of the Color-Your-Own program, as distributor. There are four different postcards with each a different picture and imprinted post stamp, all under the theme "From gratitude springs happiness". Each postcard consists of the actual picture card with an attached small strip, which can be torn off at the perforated line. The back side is divided, with the message part also divided into two. The idea was that American children would color the stamps (20 Nu each – the Bhutanese postal rate for international postcards), which are drawings of four 'Lucky Signs' in black and white, and put a few words on gratitude ("What are we grateful for") on the upper part of the message area for a school child in Bhutan, but address the postcard to themselves. They had then to stick a US stamp on that small strip which has the pre-printed address of the Philatelic Bureau, Bhutan Postal Corp., GPO Building, Thimphu, Bhutan. Alternatively, the postcards could be left with the Bhutan Post stand at the festival, which staff would then take them back to Bhutan. Bhutan Post would there divide these postcards to schools, where school kids would add their few words on gratitude on the lower message area and then the post card would be sent back to the addressee in the States or elsewhere. The strip with the address of the Philatelic Bureau would be torn off by the personnel of Bhutan Post, which was also organizing the whole process.

=== Aerogrammes ===
The P&T Department issued three aerogrammes over the years. Around 1970 the first one was issued with an imprinted stamp of 85 Chetrum, picturing a dancing demon, and in 1979 a second aerogramme was issued, with the same design but the imprinted stamp had a new face value of Nu 1.25. The third and final aerogramme was issued around 1989 with a different lay-out and the imprinted stamp of Nu. 3.50 depicts birds and flowers. The 1970 aerogramme has been available in later years surcharged to Nu. 1.50 with a postage pre-paid seal. The Nu. 3.50 aerogramme is still on sale at GPO Thimphu, but has to be uprated to the current airmail rate by adding the necessary postage stamps.

=== Inland letter sheets ===
1998 Inland letter sheet

Bhutan Post issued the country's first inland letter sheets in December 1998. The folding letters, similar to an aerogramme, were mostly distributed free of charge by Bhutan Post to make the writing of letters popular. One carries the campaign slogans "Let us produce a good relationship between parents and children through the exchange of letters" in Dzongkha on the front and on the reverse in English "Donate Blood, Save Lives". The imprinted stamp is a copy of the Nu. 3 stamp of the April 1998 WHO stamp set issued on the occasion of the 50th Anniversary of the World Health Organization (WHO). Another inland letter has been published around the same time. It carries an imprinted Nu.3 stamp of a postal runner approaching a village, and is a copy of the Nu. 3 stamp of the October 1992 set issued on the occasion of the 30th anniversary of the Bhutan Post postal service. All remaining issues of the inland letters are based on this issue. One issue was released with the overprint "FREE POST CAMPAIGN, 11 – 17 December 1998" in the middle at the top of the front. The last inland sheet issue was a set of two, released early June 1999 on the occasion of the Silver Jubilee of the 4th King Jigme Singye Wangchuck with the over print "SILVER JUBILEE, FREE POST CAMPAIGN, 2 – 12th June '99" in the upper middle of the front of the inland letter. One type has the logo of the Silver Jubilee at the middle left side, while the other type carries the same logo, slightly larger, in the left upper corner, covering also the place where the text "Inland Letter" was printed originally; this text is now relocated to the upper middle, above the Silver Jubilee Free Post Campaign inscription.

=== Stamped Envelope ===
==== The Free Post envelope to commemorate the Royal Wedding of 2011 ====
On the occasion of the Royal Wedding on 15 October 2011 of the Druk Gyalpo Jigme Khesar Namgyel Wangchuk and the Gyaltsuen Jetsun Pema Wangchuck Bhutan Post organized Free Post Days on 13, 14 and 15 October 2011 for inland mail only. Each post office received a limited number of Free Post envelopes to distribute among the public which they could use to send a letter within Bhutan for free during the three days of validity. The Free Post stamped envelope is a white rectangular cover, regularly used by Bhutan Post, with printed in large capital black letters on the top front BHUTAN POSTAL CORPORATION LTD.. The envelope furthermore is stamped with a black, round rubber seal with the words 'FREE POST DAY 13-15 OCTOBER 2011' in an outer ring, while in the inner circle the words "IN COMMEMORATION OF THE ROYAL WEDDING" are printed below a modified version of the official Royal Wedding symbol of two rings entwined in front of a khorlo (dharma wheel), and a scarf running through the rings (but without the lotus seat (padmasana), while the khorlo is less elaborate than in the official full version).

== Postal covers and other postal items ==
=== First Day Covers ===
First day of issue covers or First Day Covers (FDCs) have been issued starting with the first postage stamp issue of 10 October 1962. In the Burt Todd's Bhutan Stamp Agency (BSA) period, both the BSA as well as the P&T Department issued FDCs, often for the same stamp issue. In recent years, Bhutan Post has missed several times to produce an FDC for a particular stamp issue, although sometimes private First Day of Issue covers are known to have filled the void, for instance on the occasion of the Punakha Dzong Cantilever Bridge stamp issue of 20 March 2009.

=== Event covers ===
An event cover was issued on 20 October 1967 on the occasion of the postal exhibition held at the Tashichho Dzong in Thimphu.

=== Maxi cards ===
Maximum cards have been issued for the first time in Bhutan in July 1968, and later issues have been especially in partnership with the World Wide Fund for Nature (WWF).

=== Picture postcards issued by the P&T Dept. and Bhutan Post ===
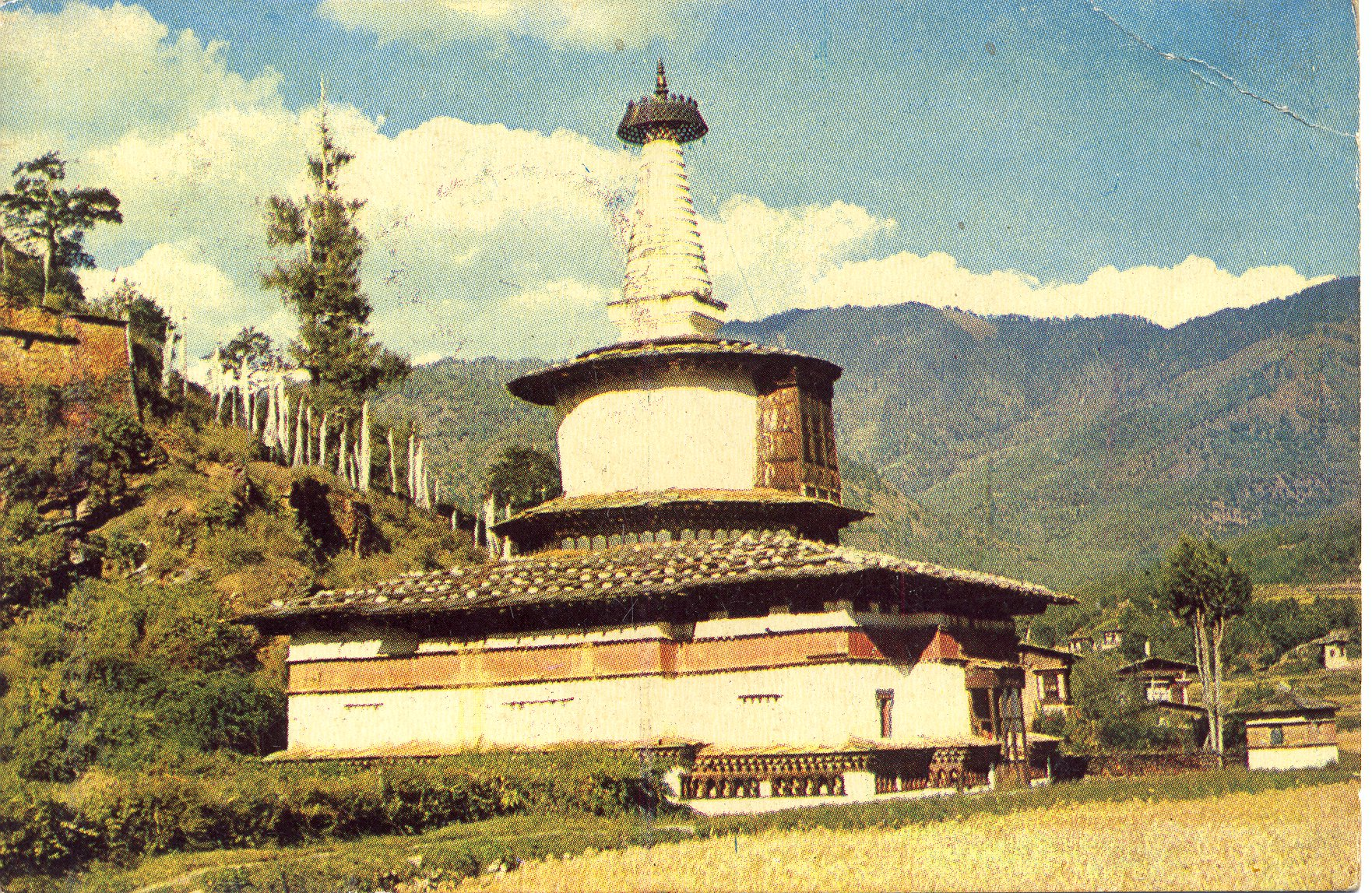
1968 Bhutan P&T first multi-color postcard showing the Dungchi Lhakhang

The P&T Department issued also picture postcards without any imprinted stamps, starting in 1968 with a set of nine multi-colored postcards which had a modern standard format (100 x 150mm) and were printed on art board paper by the Reliable Calendar Company of Calcutta (nowadays spelled as Kolkata). The pictures show dzongs, lhakhangs, a folk dance, a yak, a mother and child, in general topics which will return again and again on Bhutanese postcards, emphasizing "exotic or typical Bhutan". In the mid 1970s P&T published the set "Views/Dances of Bhutan" in four carton-board covers colored respectively blue, brown, orange and yellow, with some eight post cards in each cover. The postcards were true color glossy chrome pictures in the old, smaller format (90 x 140mm). Three sets were printed by well-known security printers, the House of Questa (blue and orange covers) and Format International Security Printers Ltd (brown cover), while the fourth yellow set was printed by the Reliable Calendar Company, which printed in the past the more modern 1968 set. A set of 63 supersized (120 x 180 mm) color postcards was issued around 1992 showing among others dzongs, lhakhangs, valleys, landscape views, dances, people, and, last but not least, the newly opened (in 1988) GPO in Thimphu. Although this set is published by P&T, there is no reference on the postcards to this, but only to the printers: in small letters and light ink it states at the left corner of the back side D&F Co. Ltd. Tel (662)3742974 Thailand. This was followed around 1993 by the Environmental Trust Fund set, 17 different postcards in full color in a carton cover, showing landscapes, local flowers, animals and the Rinpung Dzong in Paro, printed by Secura Ltd of Singapore. After the incorporation in 1996 of Bhutan Postal Corporation Ltd, using "Bhutan Post" as trade name, a steady number of sets of postcards have been issued, although at that time the private market had taken already a firm footing as well. Some of these postcards of Bhutan Post are still available from their "Philatelic eShop". The latest issue of 2010 is a set of 17 different picture post cards, all of the 5th King Jigme Khesar Namgyel Wangchuck in beautiful metallic-like colors.

=== Telegrams with postage stamps ===
In the 1960s the P&T Department also used to attach postage stamps to telegrams as token of payment of the telegraph costs.

== Post offices and postal marks ==
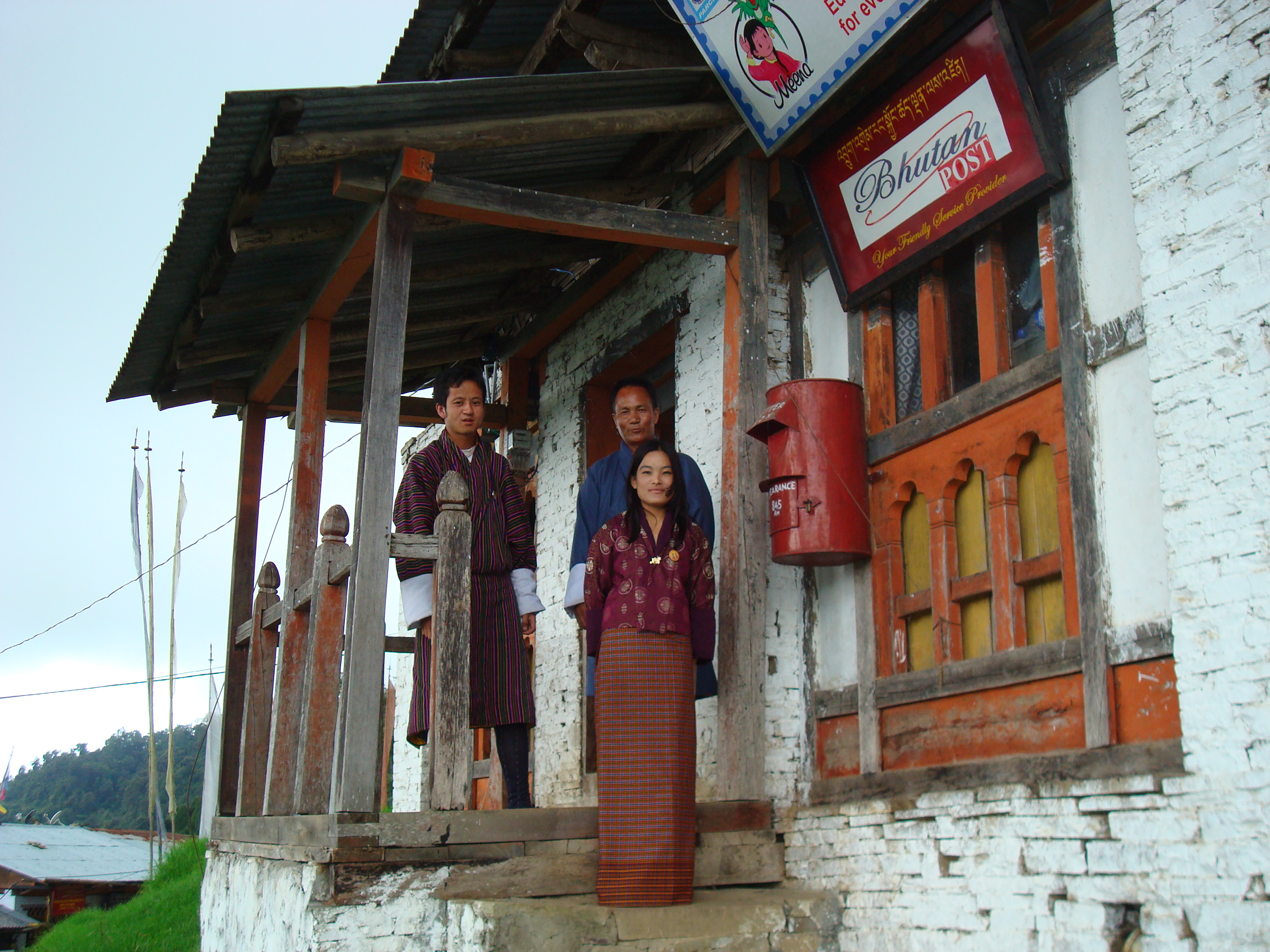
Postmistress in front of Wamrong Post Office in east Bhutan

After the opening of the first post office in Phuentsholing on 10 October 1962, the second post office opened less than a month later in Paro (with post mark Rinpung Dzong). It would take a little over a half year for Thimphu PO to open as third, with Tashichho Dzong as post mark. In the following years, aside from POs staffed by P&T Department staff members, also smaller extra-departmental post offices would be opened, mostly in remote locations, ran by postal agents, who were working on an agreement basis against a modest monthly stipend. These were first called Branch Post Office (BPO), then Agency Post Office (APO), and since a few years Community Mail Office (CMO). Budgeted in the Bhutan Five Year Plans, the number would steadily increase, from 3 POs in 1964 to 28 POs and 5 extra-departmental POs in 1971, via 45 POs and 27 BPOs in 1978, to a high 56 POs and 27 BPOs in 1988, after which we see a decrease in the full-fledged POs to 47 in 2006, but with an increase of the APOs to 43. The latest figure for 2010 is 43 POs (including the two GPOs in Phuentsholing and Thimphu) and 33 CMOs.

For mail sent in the early 1960s, postmarks of the Indian post offices handling the international mail to and from Bhutan can be found on covers mailed during that period, while postmarks of Indian post offices assisting Bhutan P&T with domestic mail routed via road or train in India were also attached to covers handled through that system.

== Collecting Bhutanese stamps ==
The Bhutan Postal Corporation Ltd. has a Philatelic Bureau to offer services to stamp collectors, who can open up a subscription to receive future issues or buy some of the older issues which are still for sale. A group of collectors organized themselves as The Bhutan Philatelic Society in the US in 1976 and publicized a quarterly The Kaleidoscope for a few years. Recently they resurfaced on Facebook as Bhutan Stamp Collectors. The Nepal and Tibet Philatelic Study Circle provides also a haven for collectors of Bhutanese stamps and Bhutan philately receives regular attention in their publication Postal Himal.

== Catalogues and publications ==
A specific stamp catalogue for Bhutan does not exist at the moment. However, information on stamp issues can be found in the Scott, Stanley Gibbons and Michel stamp catalogues.

The P&T Department of the Royal Government of Bhutan has issued a few publications with information on the history of the postal services. Early May 1969 on the occasion of the inauguration of the first Thimphu GPO building on 11 May 1969, the Department issued a booklet Postal Services in Bhutan, providing an overview of the gradual expansion of the postal services in Bhutan since 1962. In 1970 a nice 90-page booklet Bhutan Through Postage Stamps was produced, with detailed information about all stamps issued between 1962 and end 1969. Early 1976 the Philatelic Bureau of the Department published a small brochure Bhutan Stamp History with a complete listing of all stamps issued from the first postage stamps of 10 October 1962 to December 1975. No other significant publication has been issued by the P&T Department or Bhutan Post since then. The intention to publish a book on the postal history of Bhutan at the occasion of the 50th Anniversary of postal services in Bhutan (1962–2012) had to be abandoned by Bhutan Post, reportedly because of lack of funds.

Most stamps issued during the Bhutan Stamp Agency era came with an informative and often beautifully designed presentation folder, brochure and/or flyer. After 1974 only flyers and sometimes brochures were issued and for the last 15 years only intermittently. In a few cases the international agent instigating the issue of a particular set of stamps issued a presentation folder and brochure, for instance the CD-ROM stamps of 2007 and the World Food Programme set of 2009.

== Bhutan Postal Museum ==
On 7 November 2015 the Bhutan Postal Museum was opened at the General Post Office building in Thimphu. The postal museum narrates the story of the evolution of communication, transportation and postal services in Bhutan's history. The story is told through the collection of various anecdotes, artifacts and the rich assortment of stamps Bhutan has produced over the years.

== See also ==
- Bhutan Postal Corporation
- Bhutan Postal Museum
- Nepal and Tibet Philatelic Study Circle
