= APPC =

APPC may refer to:

== Technology ==
- IBM Advanced Program-to-Program Communication
- Linux App Containers

== Organizations ==
- Annenberg Public Policy Center
- Association des Psychothérapeutes Pastoraux du Canada (fr)
- Advanced Polypropylene Company
- Association of Professional Political Consultants
- Asian-Pacific Postal College, part of the Asian-Pacific Postal Union
