= Wolfgang Hellrigl =

Philatelist (1941–2010)

Wolfgang Hellrigl in later life.

Wolfgang C. Hellrigl (10 March 1941 – 23 November 2010) was an expert on the philately of Nepal and Tibet who in 1994 was invited to sign the Roll of Distinguished Philatelists.

== Early life ==
Hellrigl was born in Cologne and descended from a South Tyrolean family. His father was a prominent philatelist and an expert on old European states.

== Specialisms ==
Wolfgang Hellrigl specialised in the philately of Nepal, Tibet, India used in Tibet and Nepal, Jamnu and Kashmir and Mongolia. He was a member of the Philatelic Literature Commission of the Fédération Internationale de Philatélie (FIP) from 1996 to 1998. Wolfgang Hellrigl has been the founder and president of the Nepal and Tibet Philatelic Study Circle (NTPSC) and president of the Association Internationale des Experts en Philatéle (AIEP).

== Awards ==
Hellrigl received many awards during his lifetime. He won a Large Gold medal for his "Classic Nepal" and a Grand Prix at the international exhibition in Brno 2005 for his "Jamnu and Kashmir". He also won the Tilleard Medal from the Royal Philatelic Society London in 1987, of which society he was a Fellow, and the Martin Memorial Literature Awards in 1978, 1984 and 1992.

In 2008 he won the Lindenberg Medal and in the same year he received the Hunziker Medal of the A.I.E.P.

His work in Indian philately was acknowledged by the award of the Martin Memorial Trophy of the India Study Circle.

== Publications ==
- Tibet: a philatelic and numismatic bibliography: a critical bibliography containing over 400 titles of Tibetan philately, numismatics and postal and monetary histories, 1981. (With Karl Gabrisch)
- The Classic Stamps of Nepal, The Nepal and Tibet Philatelic Study Circle, Bozen, Italy, May 1984. (with Frank Vignola)
- The Native Postmarks of Nepal, 1978. (with Colin Hepper)
- The Postal Markings of Tibet, Published by Geoffrey Flack, Vancouver, Canada, 1996.
- Nepal Postal History, Giulio Bolaffi Editore, Turin and Bozen, 1991.
- Katalog der Poststempel von Nepal (1879-1935) A Catalogue of Nepalese Postmarks (1897-1935), Forschungsgemeinschaft Indien E.V. im Bund Deutscher Philatelisten E.V., Germany, no date.

== See also ==
- Postage stamps and postal history of Nepal
- Postage stamps and postal history of Tibet
