= Bhutan Postal Museum =

Museum in Thimphu, Bhutan

- Established: 7 November 2015
- Location: Bhutan
- Type: Postal
- Website: www.bhutanpostalmuseum.bt

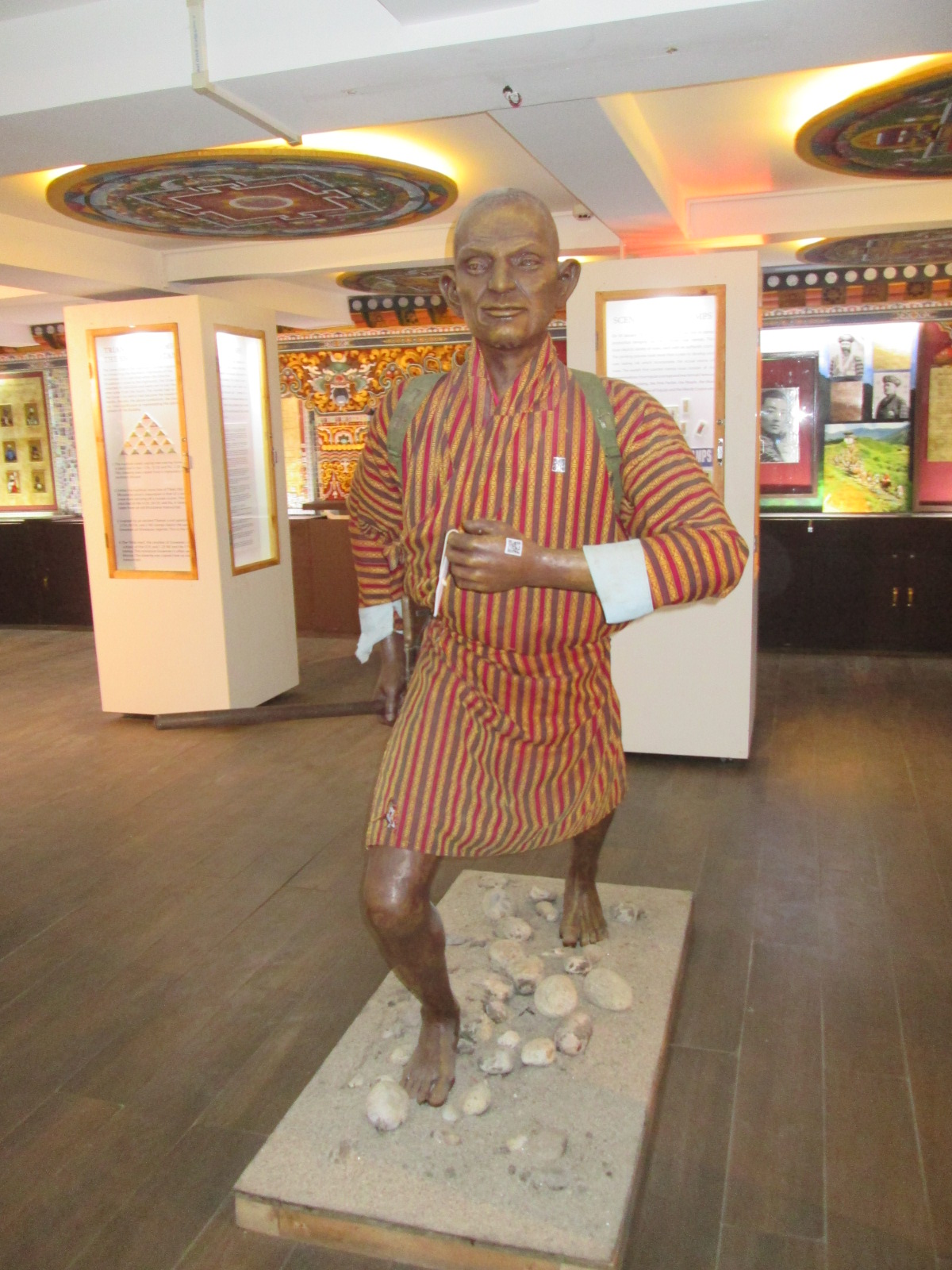
Bhutan Postal Runner as displayed in the Bhutan Postal Museum in Thimphu, Bhutan

The Bhutan Postal Museum was opened on 7 November 2015 at the General Post Office building in the capital city Thimphu. The postal museum captures the story of the evolution of communication, transportation and postal services in Bhutan. The story is told through a collection of various anecdotes, artifacts and a rich assortment of stamps Bhutan has produced over the years.

The museum's five galleries trace the development Bhutan's postal system, from the earliest mail runners to Bhutan's often unusual and highly collectable stamps:

- Gallery I is used for temporary exhibitions, changing according to special occasions in the country and stamp releases.
- Gallery II traces the history of communication during the pre-postal era when messengers were used to deliver government decrees and letters.
- Gallery III tells the story of the development of the postal and telegraph system in Bhutan and showcases old postal and telegraphic equipment, devices and furniture.
- Gallery IV exhibits the stamp issues dedicated to the Wangchuck Dynasty, with information on the institution of the monarchy in 1907 and a brief life history of the successive kings of Bhutan.
- Gallery V displays Bhutan’s postage stamps, which have been used as "Little Ambassadors" to promote Bhutan’s independence, rich culture, and fauna and flora. On display are, among others, Bhutan's famous 'Talking Stamps'

The Museum is open from Monday to Saturday from 9:00 AM - 5 PM during summer and 9:00 AM - 4 PM during winter. It is also open during the Thimphu Drubchoe and Tshechu. Bhutan Postal Museum has already become popular among international tourists and is listed as a "Must Visit Attraction" in Bhutan.
