= Postage stamps and postal history of Tibet =

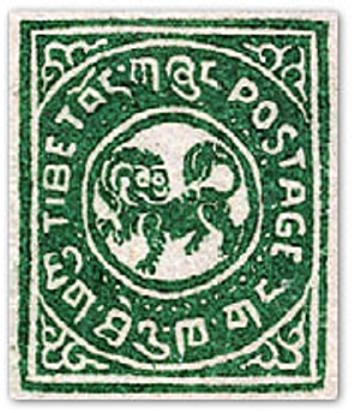
Tibetan snow lion postage stamp. 1912 issue

This is a survey of the postage stamps and postal history of Tibet.

== Foreign stamps ==
The first adhesive stamps issued for use in Tibet were typewritten overprints on Indian postage stamps through the 1903 period, during which the Tibetan Frontier Commission, led by Sir Francis Younghusband, arrived in Kamba Dzong on July 7, 1903. Soon after, as no progress was made in diplomatically settling issues of the Tibetan border with Sikkim, this became a military expedition. One result of the treaty signed September 7, 1904, was the establishment of Indian Postal Agencies at Gartok, in Western Tibet, and Gyantse, Pharijong and Yatung, along the Indian trade route to Lhasa. Chinese forces occupied Tibet in 1909, when the Dalai Lama fled into Sikkim and India. However, there were Chinese communities in Tibet well before this, as shown by a registered letter from Wen Tsung-yao at Lhasa, January 9, 1909. Thereafter, Chinese stamps and special Chinese date stamps were used at Chabdo, Gyantse, Lhasa, Phari Dzong, Shigatse and Yatung. Postal communications of this period are scarce and eagerly sought after by both Chinese and Tibetan specialists.

== First stamps of Tibet ==
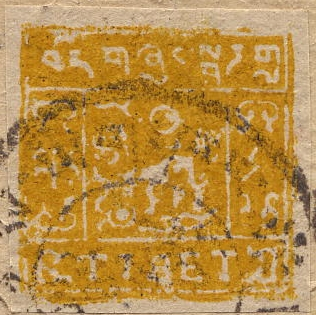
Tibetan 7 1/2 skar postage stamp, 1933 issue

Tibet began issuing postage stamps at the beginning of the 20th century. The first stamps were issued in Lhasa in 1912. Other series of stamps were issued in 1914, 1933, and through the end of the 1950s.

Tibetan stamps had a figure of a snowlion, the national emblem of Tibet. The stamps were marked in Tibetan characters meaning "Tibet Government" and in English by "Tibet".

== Fakes and forgeries ==
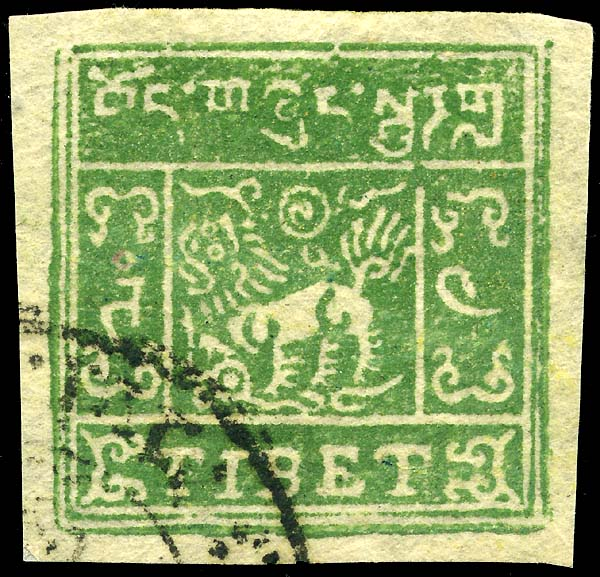
A likely forged stamp with postmark

Collectors and philatelists encounter many fakes and forgeries of both Tibetan stamps and cancellations. Genuine postally used material also has been produced for collectors.

== See also ==
- Nepal and Tibet Philatelic Study Circle
- Wolfgang Hellrigl

== References and sources ==
Sources

- Bibbins, Frealon, Tibet, First Series, 1912, plating notebook (1992)
- Haverbeck, Harrison D.S., The Postage stamps and postal history of Tibet, (1952, 1958)
- Hellrigl, Wolfgang C. The Postal markings of Tibet, (1996)
- Hellrigl, Wolfgang C and Gabrisch, Karl. Tibet: a philatelic and numismatic bibliography: a critical bibliography containing over 400 titles of Tibetan philately, numismatics and postal and monetary histories. [Part I - Philatelic bibliography], 1981
- Holmes, Henry Robert, The Postage Stamps of Tibet, (1941)
- Singer, Armond E., Tibet 1809-1975, (1995)
- Virk, D.S. Sikkim-Tibet, 1903-1908, (1989)
- Waterfall, Arnold C., The Postal History of Tibet, Robson Lowe (1965, rev. 1981) ISBN 0-85397-199-4
