= Nepal and Tibet Philatelic Study Circle =

The Nepal and Tibet Philatelic Study Circle (NTPSC) exists to promote interest in and the study of the stamps and postal history of Nepal, Tibet, Bhutan and Sikkim. The NTPSC was formed in 1974 as The Nepal Study Circle by Dr. Wolfgang Hellrigl and Colin Hepper with the aim of encouraging the study of stamps and postal history of Nepal. Over the years Tibet was included in the name, while also attention was given to stamps of Bhutan and Sikkim.

The NTPSC publishes a quarterly journal, Postal Himal, and books and monographs relating to these countries. Postal Himal is included in the Digital Himalaya Project, while the list of contents for each issue can be found on the NTPSC official website.

== Publications ==
- Hellrigl, Wolfgang & Hepper, Colin, The Native Postmarks of Nepal, 1978
- Hepper, Colin, The Sri Pashupati Issues of Nepal
- Hellrigl, Wolfgang, Nepal Postal History
- Hellrigl, Wolfgang & Vignola, Frank, The Classic Stamps of Nepal, 1984
- van der Wateren, Dick, Nepal Postal Stationery 1995
- Hellrigl, Wolfgang, The Postal Markings of Tibet, 1996.
- Hepper, Colin, The Modern Postmarks of Nepal

== See also ==
- Postage stamps and postal history of Bhutan
- Postage stamps and postal history of Nepal
- Postage stamps and postal history of Tibet
