= Postage stamps and postal history of Nepal =

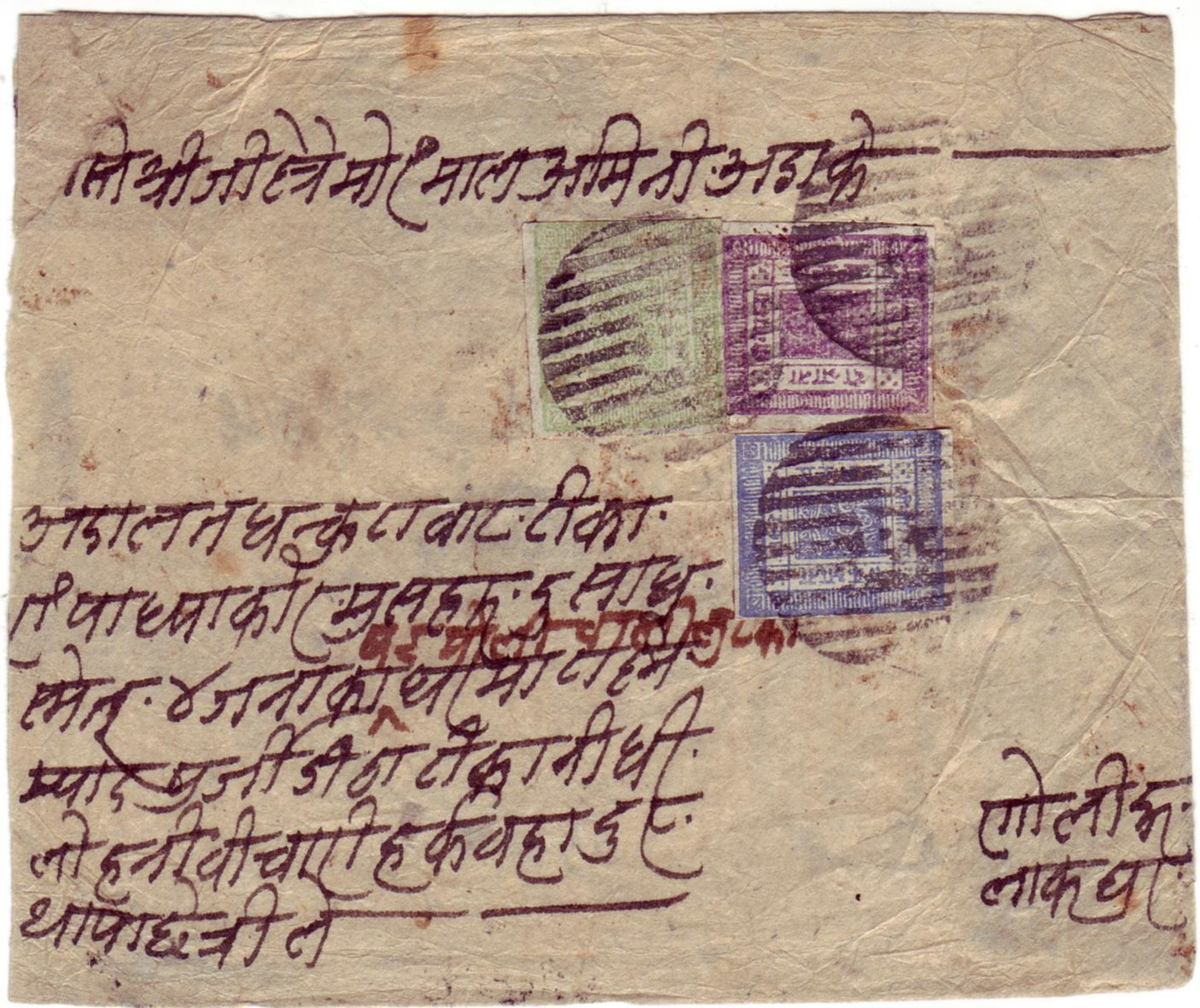
First stamps of Nepal on cover, 1881

Nepal has a long postal history. The modern form of postal service was started by the Rana Prime minister Ranaudip Singh in 1878. He established the first post office which was named Nepal Hulak Ghar. In 1881, the first postal stamp was issued. As of 2020, about 1367 types of postal stamps have been issued. Currently, the postal service is regulated by the Postal act of Nepal. Nepal Post, locally known as Hulak Sewa (Nepali: हुलाक सेवा विभाग) or Daak Sewa (Nepali: डाँक सेवा) under the Ministry of Information and Communications is responsible for the postal service in Nepal.

== Pre-stamp era ==
During the reign of King Prithivi Narayan, 1742–1774, official mail was carried around the kingdom by horse. Nepal's early regular postal service is hard to verify as no records have been located, though 1875 is mentioned by some authors, as a time when government runners began to connect Kathmandu with Gorkha, Pokhara and Palpa. However, Hellrigl & Hepper suggest 1879 because postmark evidence shows that native postmarks were in use, postal routes were extended, mail was accepted from the public and a nucleus of post offices were in operation from that year.

== First stamps ==
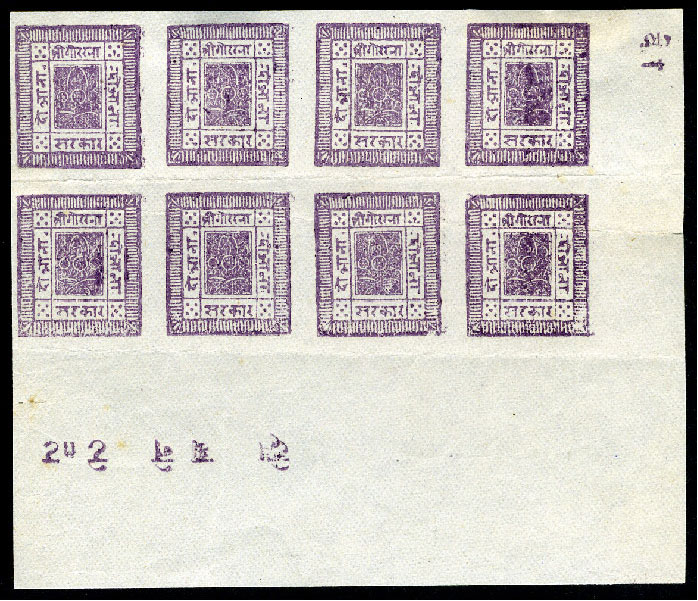
A corner block of eight Nepali stamps from 1881

The first Nepalese postage stamps were issued in April 1881 as a set of three which were valued at one anna, two annas, and four annas, inscribed as the Kingdom of Gorkha in Nepali script. These were initially perforated and printed on European-made paper. These stamps were printed with the press that Jang Bahadur Rana had brought from England. Within a few months they were released imperforate. In 1886 they were reprinted on hand-made Nepalese paper. Numerous printings of these first three values on the local paper were made for postal use until 1907, when new European-manufactured stamps picturing the god Pashupati were issued.

The remainders of the first three values were brought out of storage and reissued for telegraph use in 1917. Several more telegraph-era printings followed. The last of these printings was in 1929.

== Pashupati issue ==
Several printings were made of the stamps depicting the Hindu deity Pashupati. These were first issued in 1907 and continued until 1935 in several values, colours and values.

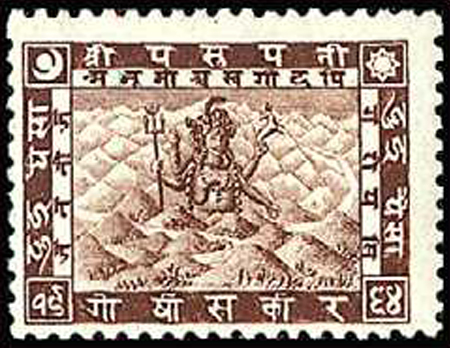
1907 stamp depicting Pashupati

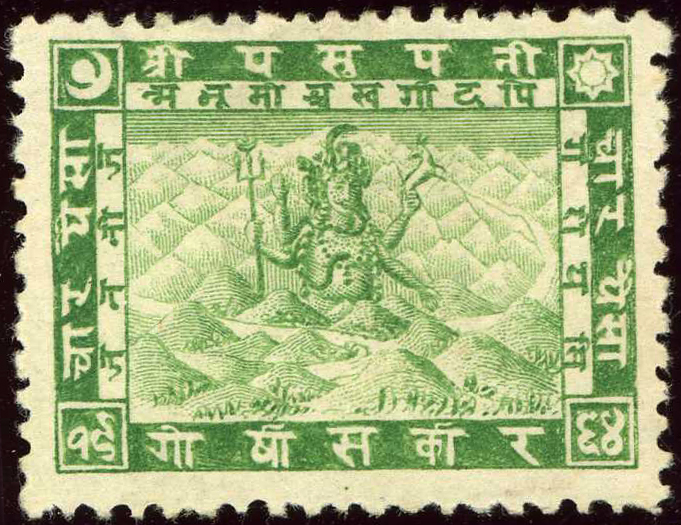
4 piasa denomination stamp of 1907

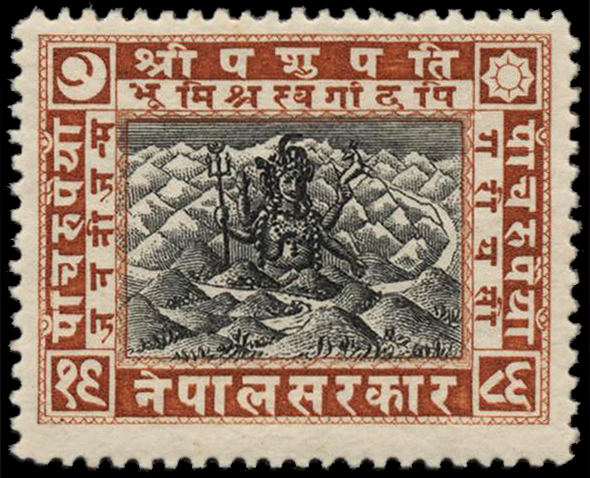
1929 Nepali Pashupati stamp

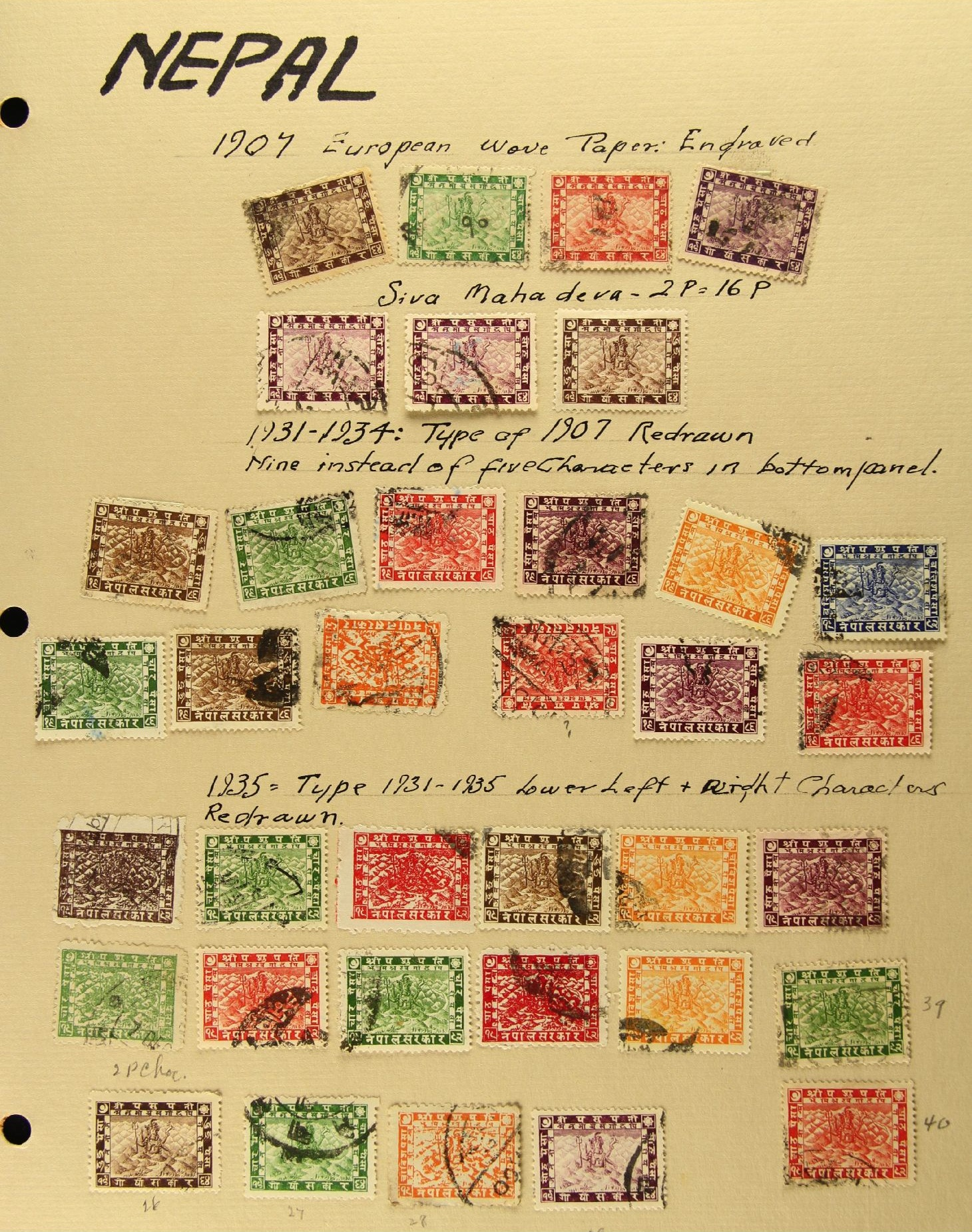
Selection of 1907–1935 Pashupati stamps

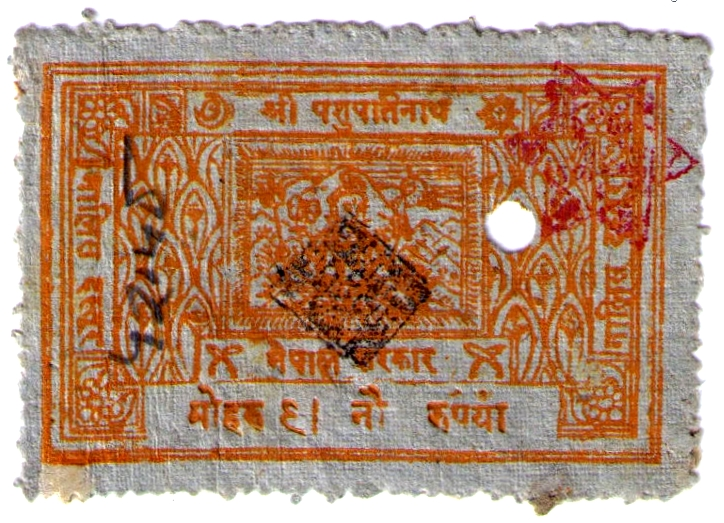
9 rupees revenue stamp of Nepal for court fees

== Current situation ==
Currently, Nepal Post (Nepali: हुलाक सेवा विभाग) which is run by the Department of Postal Services the Nepal under Ministry of Information and Communications operates the postal service in Nepal. It has two central offices General post office (GPO) and Postal Training Center in Kathmandu and Province offices in Biratnagar, Pokhara, Surkhet, Dang, Dhanusa and Kailali. Also there are 70 district offices and 676 post offices near local level and 3074 small post offices. Nepal Post also has participation with the EMS system.

== UPU membership ==
Nepal became a member of the Universal Postal Union (UPU) on 11 October 1956 (Ottawa Congress) which became effective from 14 April 1959.

== See also ==
- Nepal and Tibet Philatelic Study Circle
- Nepal Post

== References and sources ==
Notes

Sources

- Shrestha, Dr. Ramesh. Nepalese Postal History from the earliest times until 1959. Kathmandu, Nepal: Kazi Madhusudan Rajbhandary, 2009.
