= Inter-Governmental Philatelic Corporation =

The IGPC logo.

The Inter-Governmental Philatelic Corporation, or IGPC, is a philatelic agency that represents over 70 countries in the design, production, and marketing of postage stamps. It also assists postal administrations with the running of their postal services. IGPC claim to produce nearly half of the different postage stamps issued each year but have been criticized for inappropriate and excessive issues.

== Legal status ==
IGPC is a private business, not an international organisation. It is run for profit and countries using its services are customers, not members.

== Origins ==
The IGPC was founded by businessman Dr. Manfred Lehmann (1922–1997). Lehmann had taken an interest in the development of newly independent countries in Africa and the Caribbean. The IGPCs first country client was the newly independent Ghana (formerly the colony of Gold Coast) who in 1957 appointed them to help with the distribution of their stamps and the administration of their post offices. The following year Togo became a client of IGPC and, later, Caribbean countries too. The fall of communism created more clients for IGPC and by the late 1980s IGPC had over 50 client countries. A key development was obtaining the permission of the Disney company to use their cartoon characters on stamps during the 1979 International Year of the Child. Disney themed stamps have since become an important part of the company's output.

== Stamp issues ==
The IGPC is particularly noted for the issue of stamps featuring popular thematic subjects, cartoon characters and individuals from sport and entertainment that have been criticized as having little connection with the culture or history of the issuing countries. The mass issue of stamps featuring images from American pop culture has even been called a form of cultural imperialism.

Examples of inappropriate issues might be those from Tuvalu, a small group of Polynesian islands in the South Pacific and an IGPC client, whose stamps have featured the American artist Norman Rockwell and the Chinese New Year.

In their own words "The New York based philatelic agency was the first to engage in depicting high profile icons and recognized motifs on in order to assist its clients in releasing a new breed of postage stamps, which honor pop culture and sport heroes of the day including Elvis Presley, Marilyn Monroe, Pokémon, Popeye, John Lennon, the Walt Disney cartoon characters and classic motion pictures, Jackie Chan, Barbra Streisand, Bob Dylan, Major League Baseball, NFL Superbowl (sic), and the Sylvester Stallone 'Rocky' motion pictures to name just a few."

IGPC has replied to charges of inappropriate issues by saying that "Pop culture stamps are only about 10 percent of what we do, even though they get most of the attention, insists Lonnie Ostrow, an I.G.P.C. spokesman. The rest are what we call 'definitives' -- the usual flags, flowers, fearless leaders and dead presidents."

According to IGPC, they employ a research team of over 100 members, and use over 300 freelance stamp artists. IGPC state that they have "...a full-time staff of graphic designers and in-house artists who can create a stamp design literally overnight."

== Sponsorship ==
IGPC has a program of sponsorship of philatelic events and postal services. Thematic stamp shows have been sponsored in the United States in support of one of IGPC's key markets and in 2007 the company provided 12 vehicles to the new Liberian post office. In 2006 IGPC had printed the first stamps of Liberia since the end of the civil war.
