= Asian-Pacific Postal Union =

Intergovernmental organization

- Logo of the Asian-Pacific Postal Union
- Abbreviation: APPU
- Formation: 1 April 1962 (64 years ago)
- Type: Intergovernmental organization
- Headquarters: Bangkok, Thailand
- Coordinates: 13.8860925°N 100.5701929°E
- Region served: Asia Pacific
- Members: 32 state members
- Secretary General: Vinaya Prakash Singh
- Website: appu-bureau.org

The Asian-Pacific Postal Union (APPU) is an intergovernmental organization of 32 countries in the Asia-Pacific region. The purpose of the union is to extend, facilitate and improve the postal relations and promote cooperation in the field of the postal services between the member-countries. APPU is a Restricted Union as defined by Article 8 of the Universal Postal Union, serving to coordinate postal services in the region. It is headquartered in Bangkok, Thailand.

== History ==
APPU was formed (in its current form) by an international treaty through an Asian-Pacific Postal Convention signed in Yogyakarta on 27 March 1981. The organisation has origins dating back to 1961.

== Members ==
Afghanistan	Australia	Bangladesh	Bhutan
Brunei Darussalam	Cambodia	China	Fiji
India	Indonesia	Iran	Japan
Laos	Malaysia	Maldives	Mongolia
Myanmar	Nauru	Nepal	New Zealand
Pakistan	Papua New Guinea	Philippines	Republic of Korea
Samoa	Singapore	Solomon Islands	Sri Lanka
Thailand	Tonga	Vanuatu	Vietnam

== Asian-Pacific Postal College ==
APPU also runs the Asian-Pacific Postal College (APPC) founded in 1970 supporting the training and development of member states' postal staff. The APPC is also based in Bangkok, Thailand.

== See also ==
- Asia-Pacific Telecommunity
- African Telecommunications Union (ATU)
- Caribbean Postal Union (CPU)
- Caribbean Telecommunications Union (CTU)
- European Conference of Postal and Telecommunications Administrations (CEPT)
- Postal Union of the Americas, Spain and Portugal
- List of telecommunications regulatory bodies
