= Goa sausage =

Pork sausage originating from Goa, India

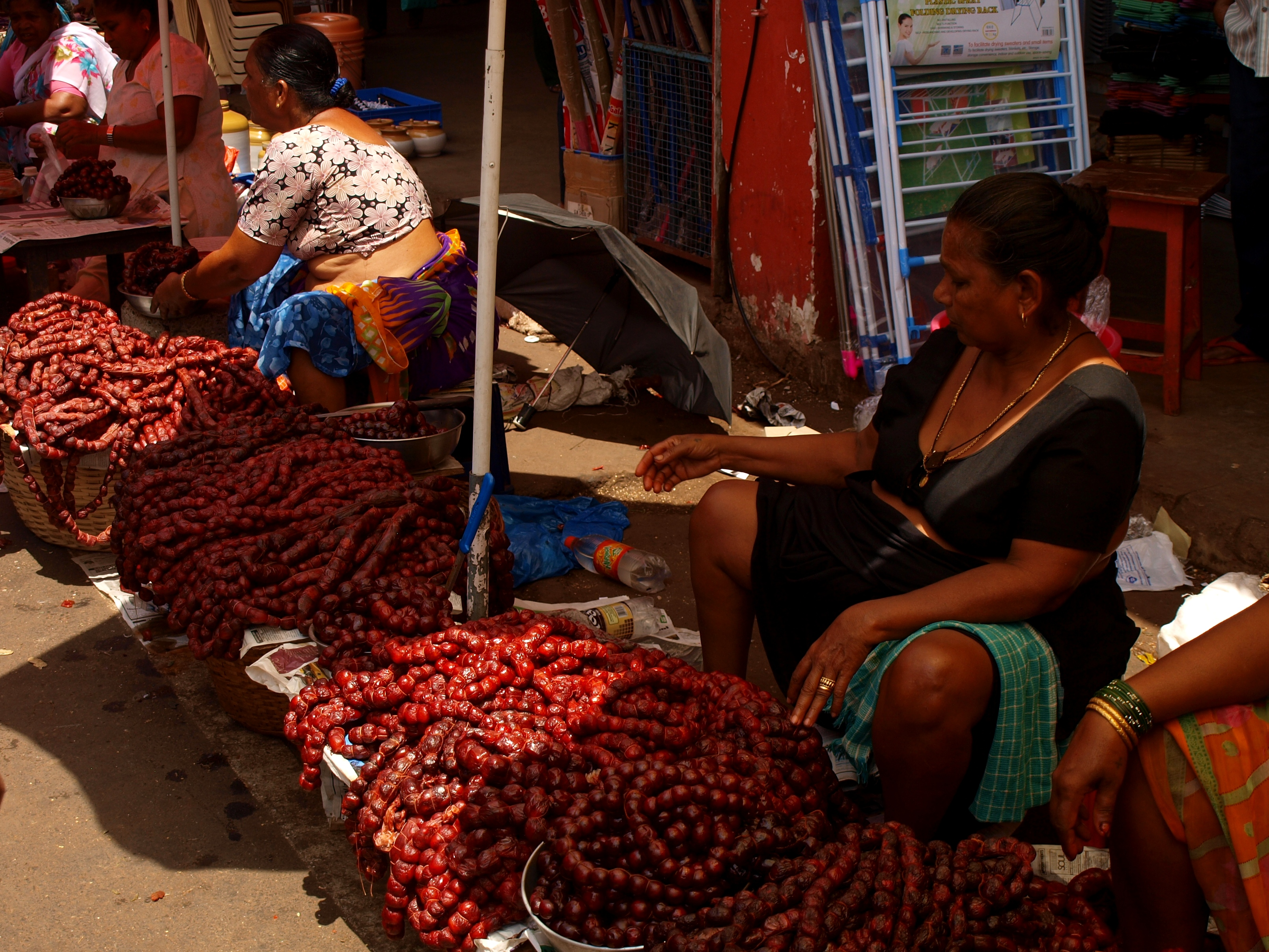
Homemade Choris-a on sale at the Mapusa market, in Bardez, Goa.

The Goa sausage or Choris is a typical reflection of Indo-Portuguese cuisine from Goa, which once were part of Portuguese India. It is based on the Chouriço sausage, introduced from Portugal. The humidity of Goa made it difficult to produce European-styled sausages that would keep, and so the meat was pickled in vinegar, alcohol, and a chilli-spice mix before being placed in pig-gut. The Goan sausage is therefore of Iberian origin and related to the Spanish Chorizo, both of which go through a process called pimenton.

== Preparation ==
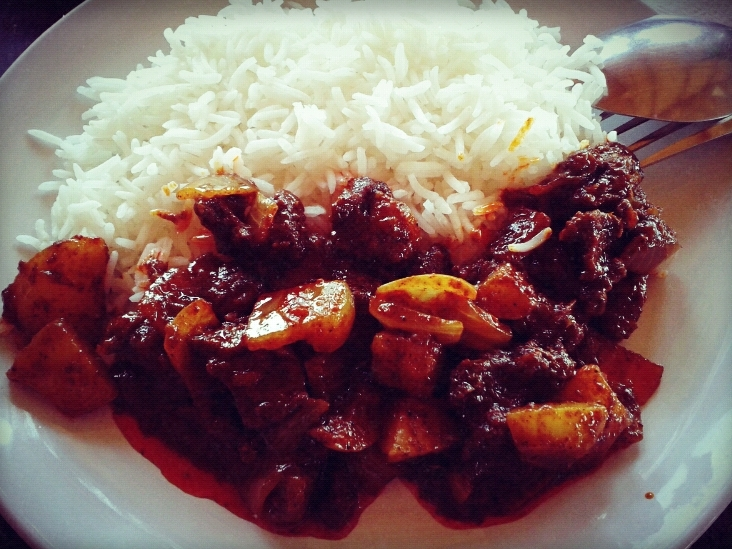
Sauteed Goa sausage with rice

The Goa sausage is prepared starting with large chunks of boneless pork that are sliced or chopped and heavily salted. The chopped meat is allowed to dry in the sun for one to two days. Following this, a mixture of spices, ground hot chilli peppers, palm vinegar, and Feni, a local liquor, is added. After filling into casings, the resulting sausages are again dried in the sun or smoked slowly.

It is usually served in a curry, boiled or fried, accompanied by white rice or baked potatoes and sometimes also with a boiled egg. Slices may be simply boiled with onion and vinegar.

According to tradition, they are prepared in the dry season around December–March and consumed in greater quantities during the monsoon/wet season, when fish is scarce.

== Consumption ==
Goa sausage is a versatile food, being sold everywhere from street food carts to high end restaurants, being used in sandwiches, stews, fillings in breads, soups, or eaten alone as a side with rice.

Choris-Pão or sausage buns are the most common forms of snacks. Choris-Pão has the sausages chopped (sometimes with onions and a dash of curry) and placed inside a Poi or the local bun, a chewier form of the western Indian Pav, and is a popular fast food sold by vendors during religious fairs or in cafés. It is a signature snack bought and eaten during the Feast of Saint Francis Xavier at Old Goa. Sausage buns are more modern, having the choris-a baked into a bun and are available at most cafés and restaurants.

In the form of a fusion food, minced sausages are also stuffed and fried between the layers of parathas and naans. They are frequently seen on restaurant menus in Goa despite neither flat bread being endemic to the region.

The sausages are also crumbled or cut and added to curries, stews, chilly fry (a sautée of vegetables and meat, usually beef), and pulão or pulav for flavour and animal protein in Goan households.

== See also ==
- Doh snam
- Gyurma
- Kargyong
- Sargemba
