= Balep =

Tibetan quickbread

Balep (Standard Tibetan: བག་ལེབ།) is a Tibetan quickbread. There are also other types of Tibetan cuisine "balep" breads and fried pies including:

- Amdo balep, a rounded bread from the Amdo region.
- Sha balep (ཤ་བག་ལེབ), fried beef pies
- Numtrak balep, deep fried bread
- Balep korkun, a pan-cooked bread
- Shamey balep, fried pies

== See also ==
- List of Tibetan dishes
