= Shab Tra =

Tibetan savoury dish

Shab Tra is a Tibetan cuisine dish of stir-fried meat tossed with celery, carrots and fresh green chili.

This dish can also be paired with tingmo and other side dishes such as roti and chinese steam buns.

== See also ==
- List of Tibetan dishes
