= Cheser mog =

Tibetan dish

In Tibetan cuisine, cheser mog is rice, with melted yak butter, brown sugar, raisins and salt.

== See also ==
- List of Tibetan dishes
