= Sepen =

Sepen may refer to:

- Sepen (sauce), a hot sauce in Tibetan cuisine
- Sepen (language) one of the Ramu languages of Papua New Guinea
