= Gyatog =

Han noodles in Tibetan cuisine

- Type: Noodle
- Place of origin: Tibet
- Main ingredients: eggs, flour, bone soup

In Tibetan cuisine, Gyatog (Tibetan: རྒྱ་ཐུག་) are noodles, much like those of the Han variety, made with eggs, flour and bone soup.

== See also ==
- List of Tibetan dishes
