= Samkham Papleg =

Tibetan dish

In Tibetan cuisine, Samkham Papleg is a fried dough with yak butter or rapeseed oil.

== See also ==
- List of Tibetan dishes
