= Tu (cake) =

Tibetan cheesecake

Tur
- Type: Cheese cake
- Place of origin: Tibet
- Main ingredients: Yak butter, brown sugar, flour. water

In Tibetan cuisine, Tu is a cheesecake, made from yak butter, brown sugar and water, shaped into a pastry.

== See also ==
- List of pastries
- List of Tibetan dishes
