= Zhoima Mogu =

Tibetan dish

In Tibetan cuisine, Zhoima Mogu is wild ginseng, with melted yak butter and sugar.

== See also ==
- List of Tibetan dishes
