= Mokthuk =

Tibetan soup

Mokthuk/Mothuk
- Alternative names: མའོ་ཁི་ཐུའུ་ཁི་ཡིས་བཤད་རྒྱུར, मुकतुक
- Place of origin: Himalayan region
- Associated cuisine: Tibetan cuisine, Nepali cuisine, Indian cuisine

Mokthuk or Mothuk (Tibetan: མའོ་ཁི་ཐུའུ་ཁི་ཡིས་བཤད་རྒྱུར།; Nepali: मुकतुक) is a type of momo soup. It is popular in Tibet, Nepal and Ladakh (a region in northern India). It originates from Tibet. It is a combination of momo and thukpa where unlike the momos, the shape of the dumplings are usually smaller known as tsi-tsi momos.

Similar to jhol momo, however the broth for mokthuk is made using either meat bones added with various herbs and vegetables, or is served with a vegetarian broth.

== See also ==
- Nepalese cuisine
- Tibetan cuisine
- Indian cuisine
- Thukpa
- Thenthuk
