= Masan (pastry) =

Tibetan pastry made with curd cheese

Masen
- Type: Pastry
- Place of origin: Tibet
- Main ingredients: Tsampa, dry cubic or curd cheese, yak butter, brown sugar, water

In Tibetan cuisine, Masen (Má sēn, 麻森)is a pastry, made with tsampa, dry cubic or curd cheese, yak butter, brown sugar and water.

== See also ==
- List of pastries
- List of Tibetan dishes
