= Thue =

Thue may refer to:

- Axel Thue, a Norwegian mathematician
- Thue (food), a Tibetan dessert
