= Drokpa katsa =

Tibetan stewed tripe dish

Drokpa Katsa
- Type: Stew
- Place of origin: Tibet
- Main ingredients: Tripe, curry, fennel, monosodium glutamate, salt

Drokpa katsa is a Tibetan cuisine dish of stewed tripe, with curry, fennel, monosodium glutamate and salt.

== See also ==
- List of stews
- List of Tibetan dishes
