= Sokham Bexe =

Tibetan dish

In Tibetan cuisine, Sokham Bexe is a fried dough, with butter and minced meat. It is said to be a favourite of the Dalai Lama and the Panchen Lama.

== See also ==
- List of Tibetan dishes
