= Dre-si =

Tibetan dessert

Dé-si is a sweet dish in Tibetan cuisine made with rice that is cooked in unsalted butter and mixed with raisins, droma (a tuber found in Tibet), dates and nuts. This dish is usually served only on Losar (Tibetan new year).

== See also ==
- List of Tibetan dishes
