= Sha Shingbee =

Tibetan stir-fry dish

Sha Shingbee is a stir-fry type dish of sliced mutton with green beans in Tibetan cuisine.

== See also ==
- List of lamb dishes
- List of Tibetan dishes
