= List of Tibetan dishes =

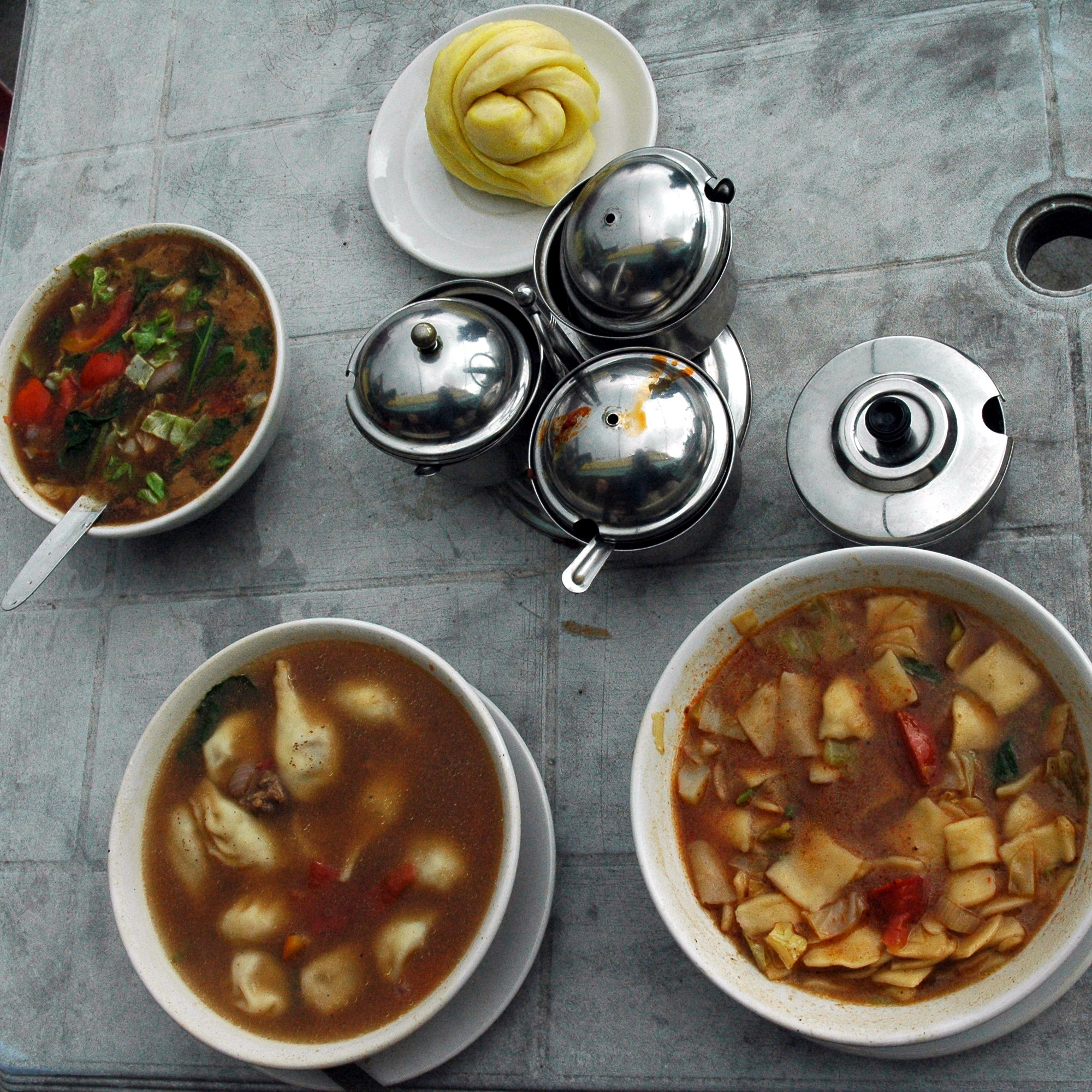
A Tibetan cuisine meal with (clockwise from top) tingmo steamed bread, thenthuk noodle soup, momos in soup, vegetable gravy (curry), and condiments in center from the Himalaya Restaurant, McLeod Ganj, Himachal Pradesh, India

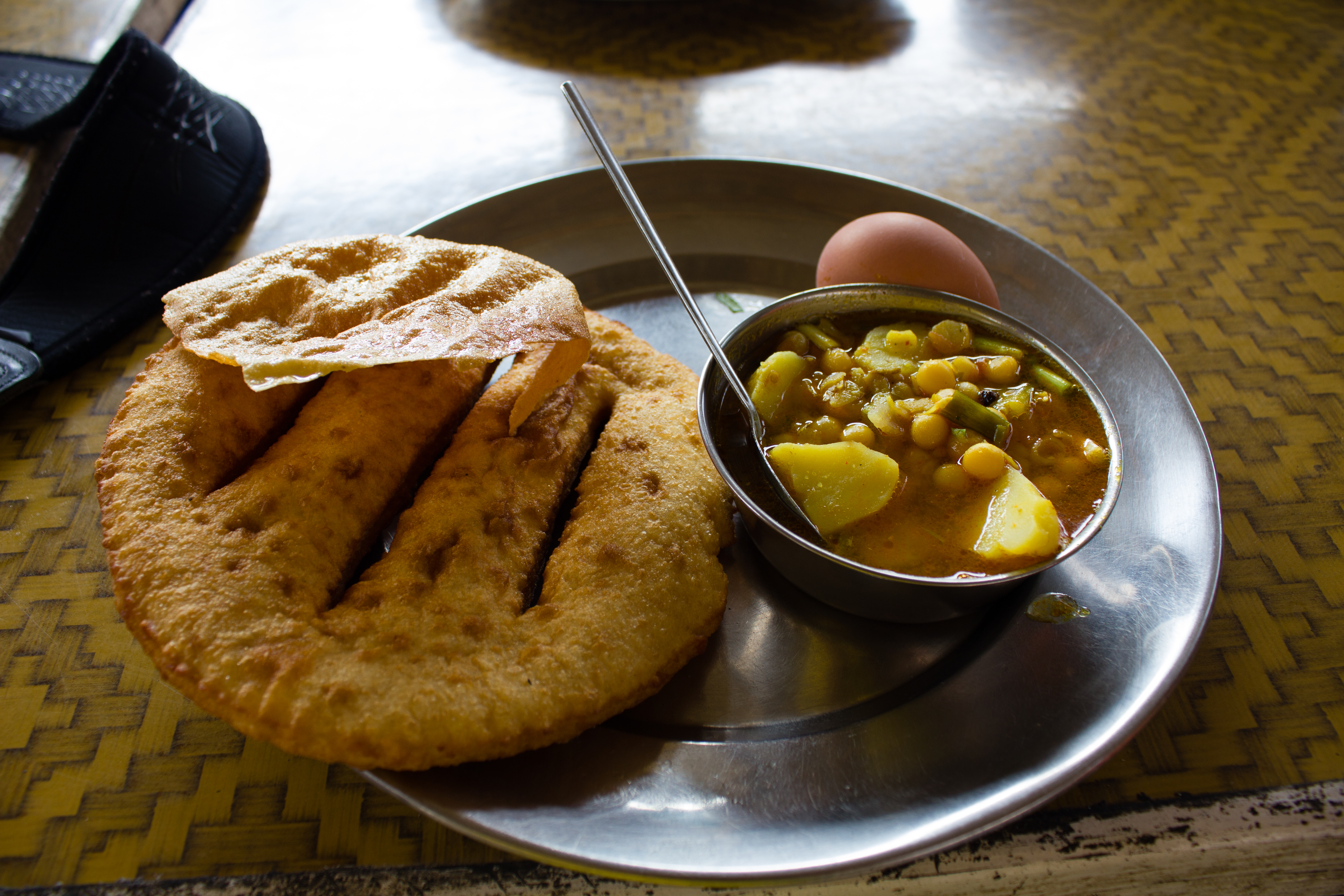
A simple Tibetan breakfast

This is a list of Tibetan dishes and foods. Tibetan cuisine includes the culinary traditions and practices of Tibet and its peoples, many of whom reside in India and Nepal. It reflects the Tibetan landscape of mountains and plateaus. It is known for its use of noodles, goat, yak, mutton, dumplings, cheese (often from yak or goat milk), butter (also from animals adapted to the Tibetan climate) and soups.

The cuisine of Tibet is quite distinct from that of its neighbors. Tibetan crops must be able grow at the high altitudes, although a few areas in Tibet are low enough to grow such crops as rice, oranges, bananas, and lemon. Since only a few crops grow at such high altitudes, many features of Tibetan cuisine are imported, such as tea, rice and others.

The most important crop in Tibet is barley. Flour milled from roasted barley, called tsampa, is the staple food of Tibet. It is eaten mostly mixed with the national beverage Butter tea. Meat dishes are likely to be yak, goat, or mutton, often dried, or cooked into a spicy stew with potatoes. Many Tibetans do not eat fish because fish are one of the Eight Auspicious Symbols of Buddhism.

== Tibetan dishes and foods ==
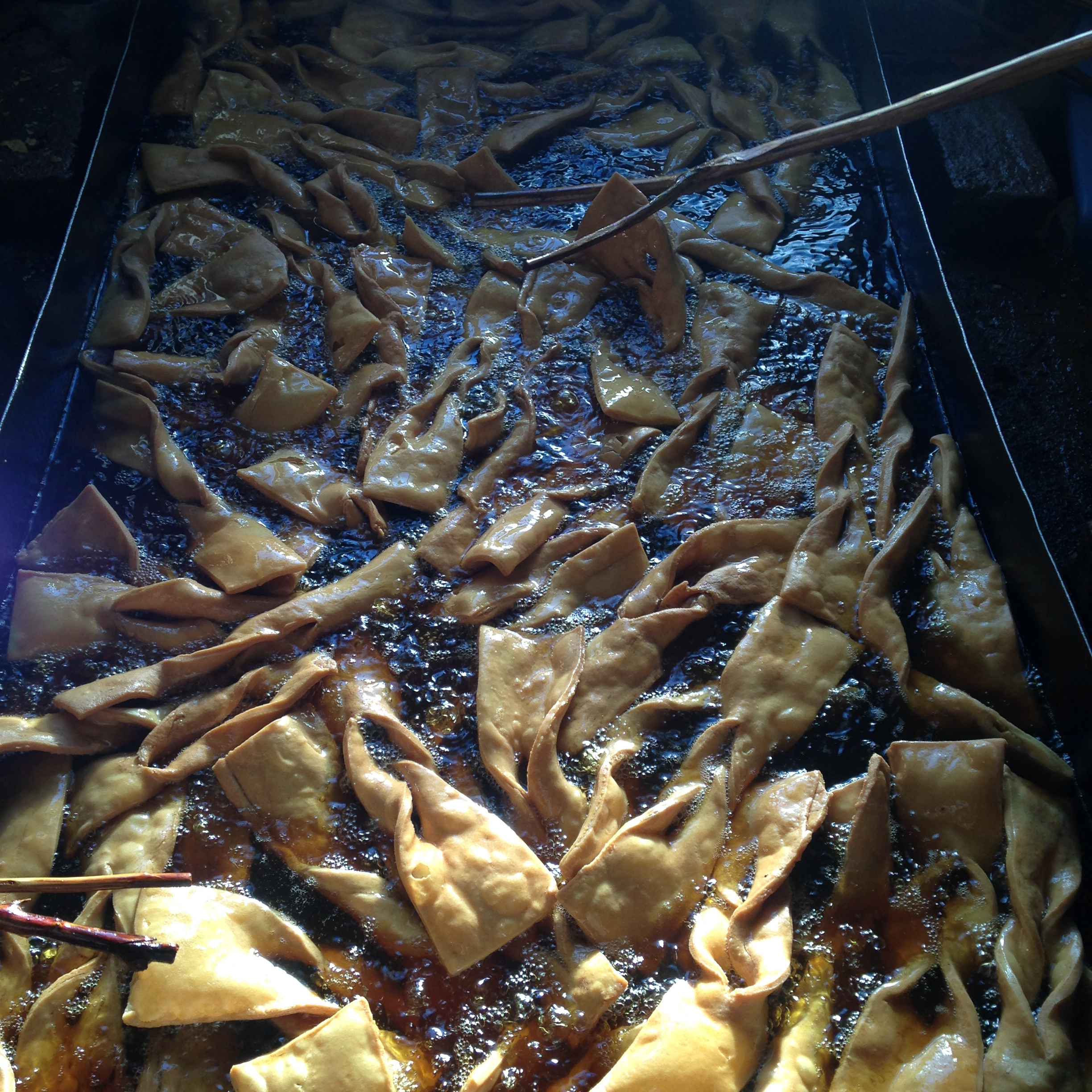
Khapse

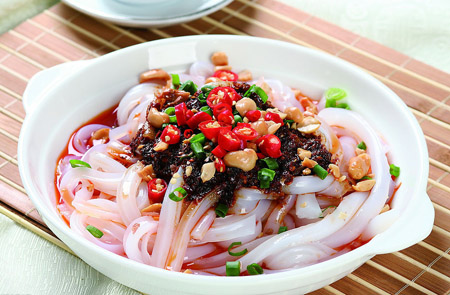
Laping

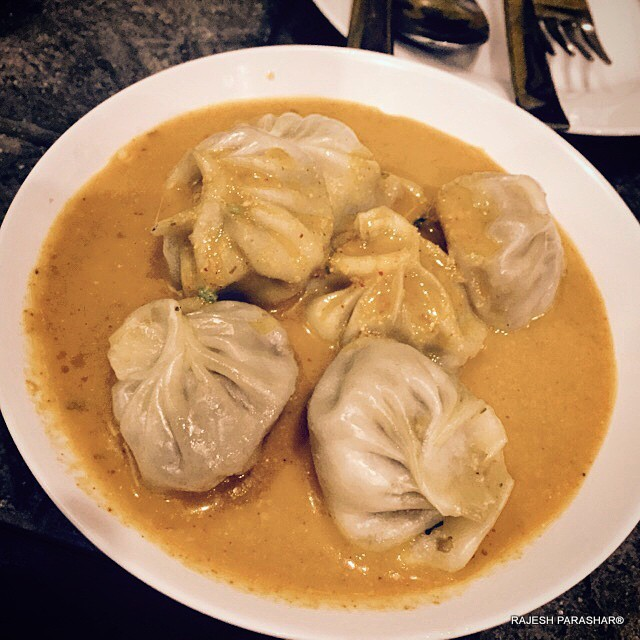
Chicken momo with curry

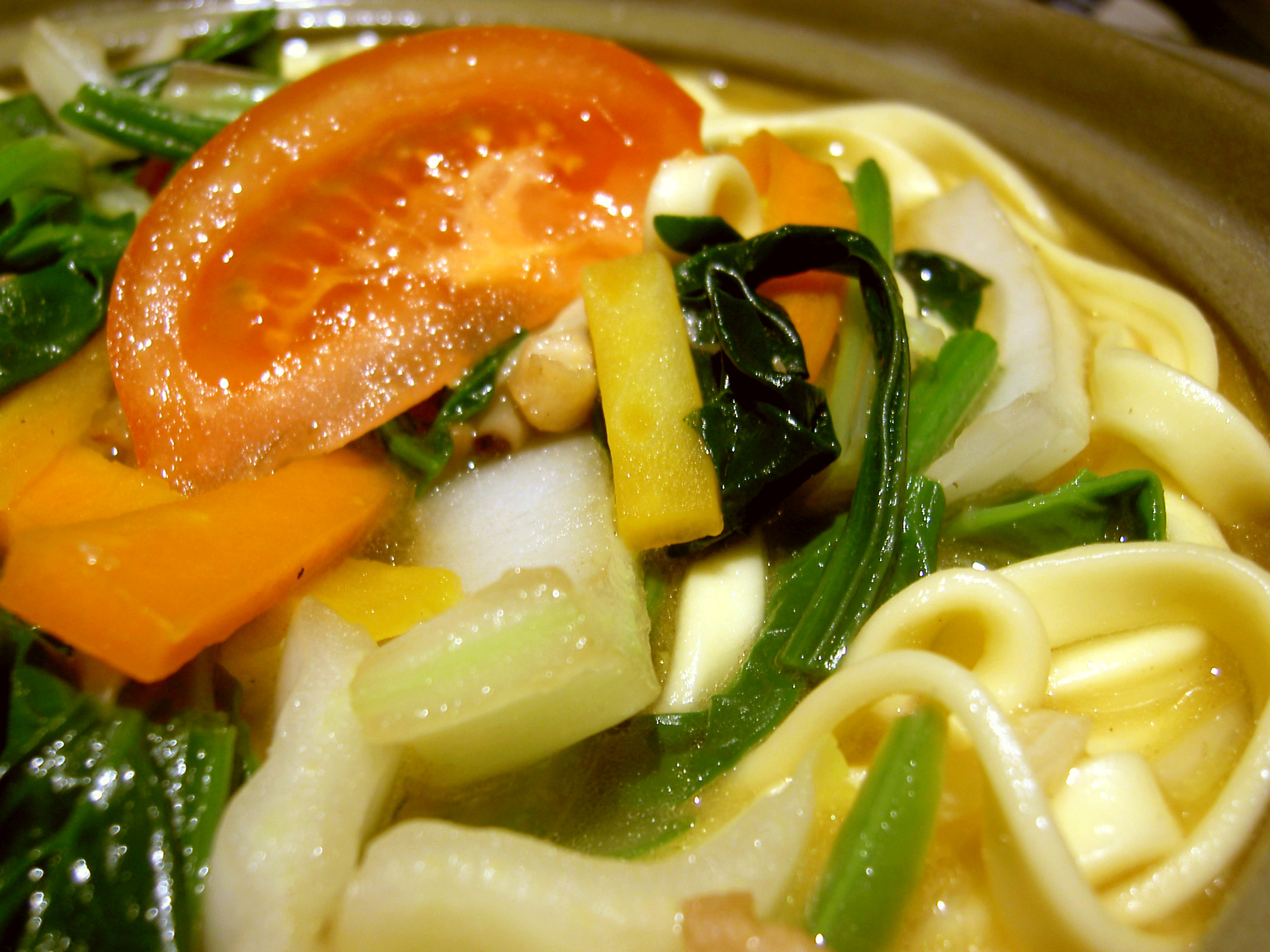
Thenthuk

- Cheser mog – rice, with melted yak butter, brown sugar, raisins and salt
- Chexo – a rice and yogurt dish
- Dropa Khatsa – a dish of stewed tripe, with curry, fennel, monosodium glutamate and salt
- Koendain – a pastry made from barley grain and yeast (fermented into a light barley beer), with tsampa, dry curd cheese, wild ginseng, and brown sugar. This pastry is often served during the Tibetan New Year and Losar as a starter.
- Gyabra – a pancake made with barley flour, yak butter, dry cheese curds and sugar
- Gyagoh (རྒྱ་ཐུག) – In Tibetan cuisine, Gyagoh is a chafing dish in the Han Chinese style; a hot pot of vermicelli, kombu, mushrooms, meatballs, bamboo sprouts and salt. It has special significance, generally eaten by senior monks during important ceremonies.
- Gyathuk (Tibetan: རྒྱ་ཐུག་) – noodles, much like those of the Han variety, made with eggs, flour and bone soup
- Gyuma – a blood sausage made with yak or sheep's blood in Tibetan cuisine. Rice or roasted barley flour can be added as filler.
- Khapsey (Tibetan: ཁ་ཟས) – cookies or biscuits that are deep fried and usually made during celebrations such as the Losar (Tibetan New Year) or weddings
- Laphing (Tibetan: ལ་ཕིང) – a spicy cold mung bean noodle dish in Tibetan cuisine
- Lowa Khatsa (གློ་བ།་ཁ་ཚ) – made of pieces of fried animal lung and spices
- Lunggoi Katsa (ལུག་མགོ།་ཁ་ཚ) – stewed sheep's head with curry, fennel, monosodium glutamate and salt
- Masan – a pastry made with tsampa, dry cubic or curd cheese, yak butter, brown sugar and water
- Momo (Tibetan: མོག་མོག) – an East Asian dumpling native to Tibet and also eaten in South Asian countries such as Nepal, Bhutan and India through Tibetan influence
  - Gong'a Momo (Tibetan: སྒོ་ང་མོག་མོག) – filled with meat paste
  - Mokthuk (Tibetan: མོག་ཐུག) – filled with broth made from pork/buffalo bones mixed with vegetables and herbs
  - Sha Momo (Tibetan: ཤ་མོག) – filled with beef or mutton
  - Shoogoi Momo (Tibetan: ཞོག་ཁོག་མོག་མོག) – prepared using mashed potato with dough, shaped into balls, with a minced meat filling, served with bread crumbs
- Sepen (Tibetan: སེ་པན།) – hot sauce made with chillies as the primary ingredient and other spices depending on the recipe
- Sha Phaley (Tibetan: ཤ་བག་ལེབ་) – bread stuffed with seasoned beef and cabbage
- Sha Shingbee – a stir-fry dish of sliced mutton with green beans
- Shab Tra – stir-fried meat tossed with celery, carrots and fresh green chili
- Sweet sour and spicy vegetable gravy – a soup-like vegetable curry in Tibetan cuisine that is often served with tingmo steamed bread
- Tsampa (Tibetan: རྩམ་པ།) – roasted barley flour, it is a staple food
- Yak butter – butter made from the milk of the domesticated yak (Bos grunniens). It is a staple food item and trade item for herding communities in south Central Asia and the Tibetan Plateau.
- Yurla – a wheat pastry with butter, particularly common in Nyainrong County in northern Tibet
- Zhoima Mogu - silverweed tubers (djüma, dröma) with melted yak butter and sugar.

=== Beverages ===
- Ara – an alcoholic beverage made from rice, maize, millet, or wheat, which may be either fermented or distilled. (Note: "'Ara', a distilled liquor extracted from rice or millet is used in the colder regions of the ...") Circa the early 1900s, ara was frequently imported from China.
- Butter tea – a drink of the people in the Himalayan regions of Nepal, Bhutan, India (particularly in Ladakh, Sikkim) and, most famously, Tibet. Traditionally, it is made from tea leaves, yak butter, water, and salt, although butter made from cow's milk is increasingly used, given its wider availability and lower cost. Yak butter tea has been described as the "Tibetan national beverage."
- Chhang – traditional Tibetan beer
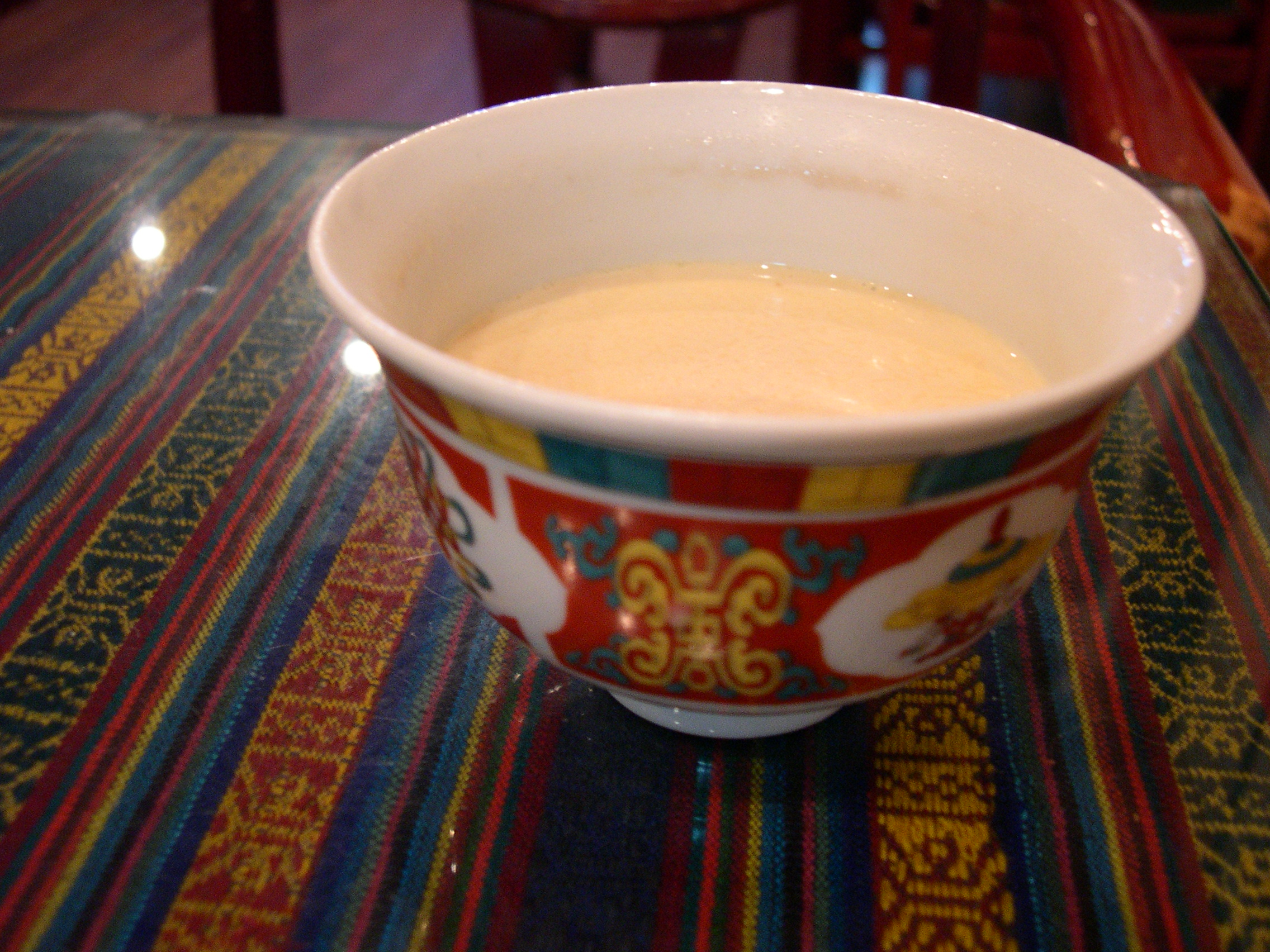
Butter tea

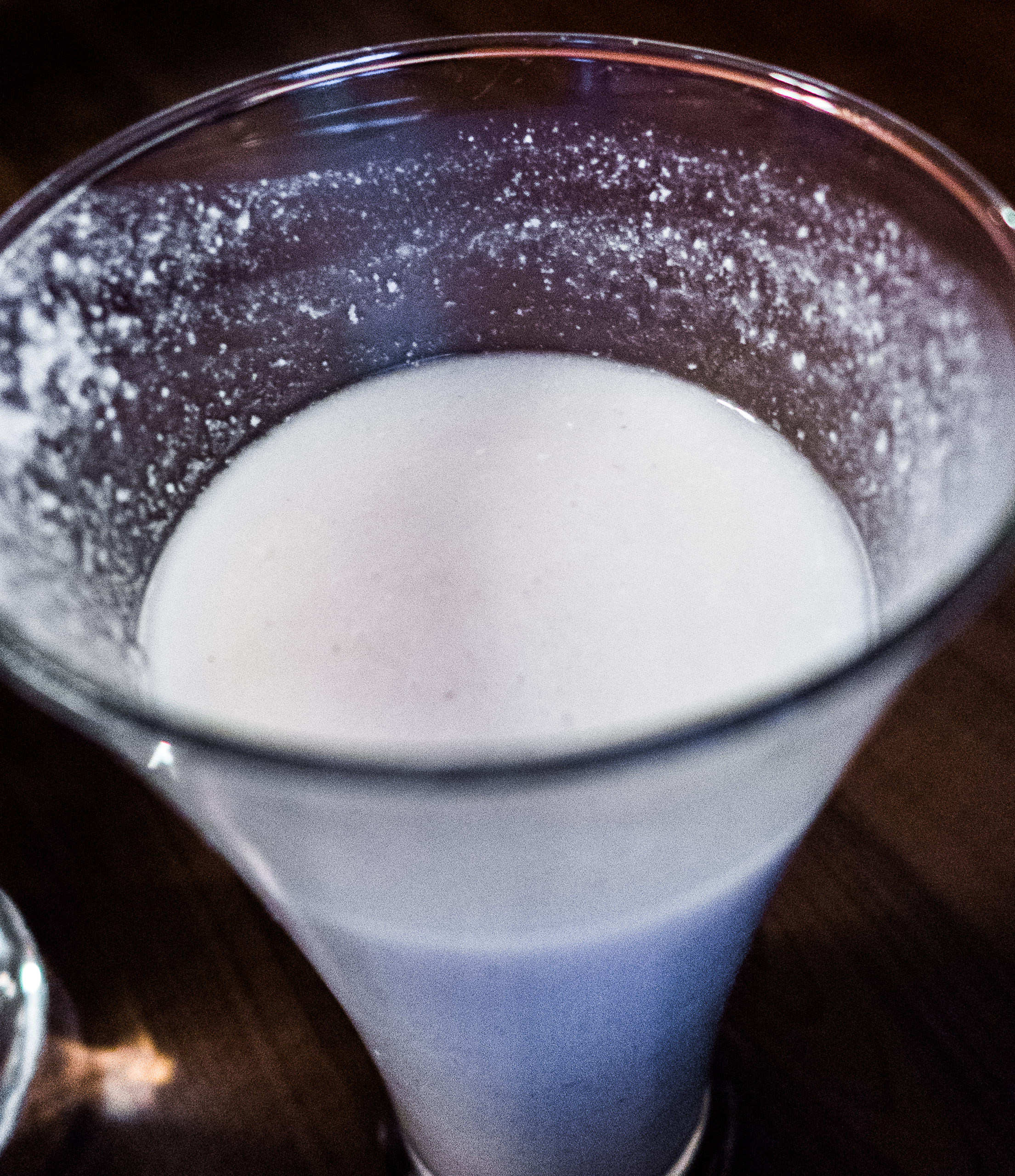
Chhaang

=== Breads ===
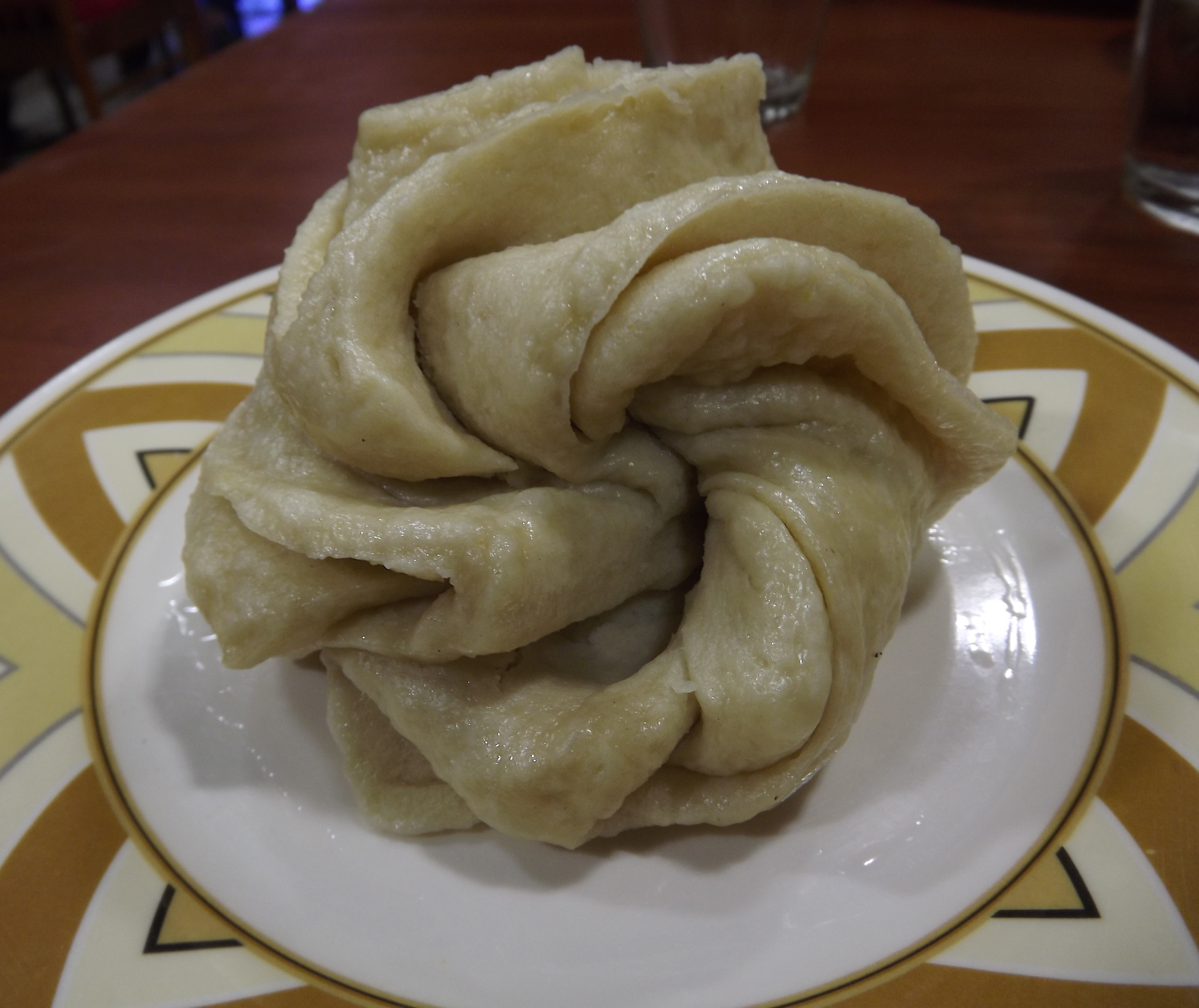
Tingmo

- Balep – Different types of quick breads
- Balep korkun – a round and flat bread that is consumed mainly in central Tibet
- Tingmo – a steamed bread

=== Cheeses ===
- Chhurpi – there are two varieties of chhurpi, a soft variety (consumed as a side dish with rice) and a hard variety (chewed like a betel nut)
- Chura kampo – made from the curds left over from boiling buttermilk, there are many possible shapes for chura kampo
- Chura loenpa – a soft cheese, similar to cottage cheese, made from the curds that are left over from boiling buttermilk
- Shosha – a pungent cheese and staple food that is often made from animals suited to the climate such as yak and goat
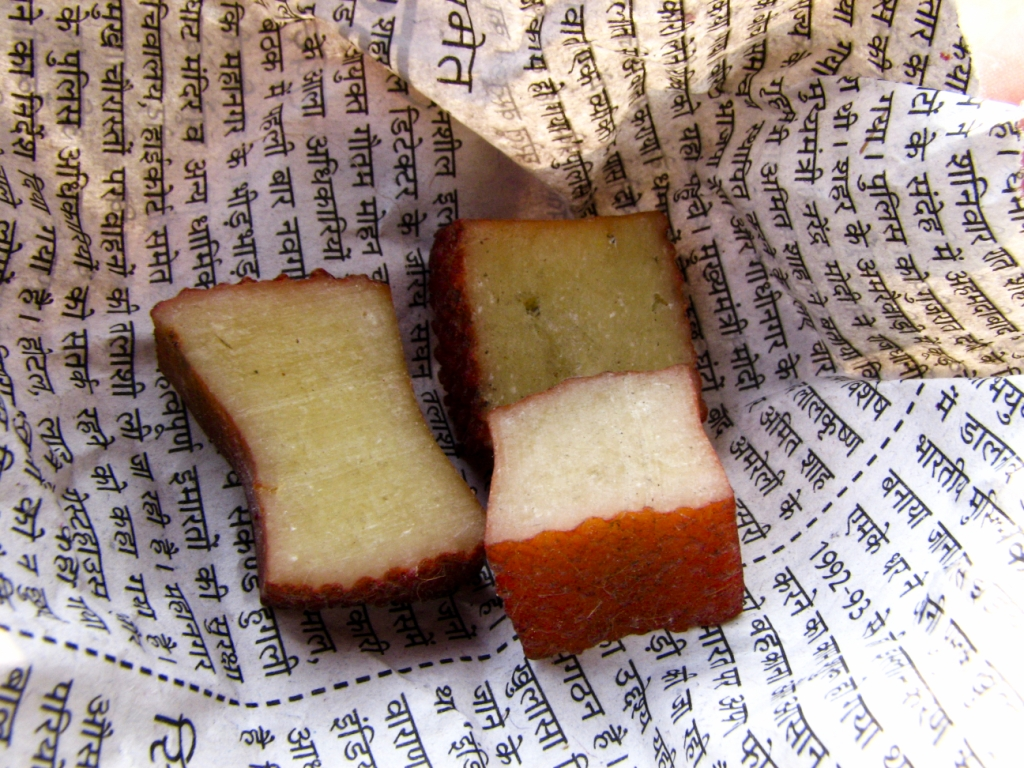
Chhurpi

=== Desserts and sweets ===
- Dre-si – a sweet dish made with rice that is cooked in unsalted butter and mixed with raisins, droma (gourd shaped root found in Tibet), dates and nuts. This dish is usually served only on Losar (Tibetan new year).
- Thue – a delicacy in Tibetan cuisine made with dri cheese (or sometimes Parmesan or other hard cheeses), brown sugar (usually porang) and unsalted sweet cream butter
- Tu – a cheese cake, made with yak butter, brown sugar and water, made into a pastry.

=== Dough foods ===
- Chetang Goiche – strips of dough fried with rapeseed oil, topped with brown sugar
- Baktsamarkhu – a dough shaped into balls with melted butter, brown sugar, and dry curd cheese. It has a sweet and sour taste and is red in color.
- Samkham Papleg – a dough fried in yak butter or rapeseed oil
- Sokham Bexe – fried dough with butter and minced meat

=== Soups and stews ===
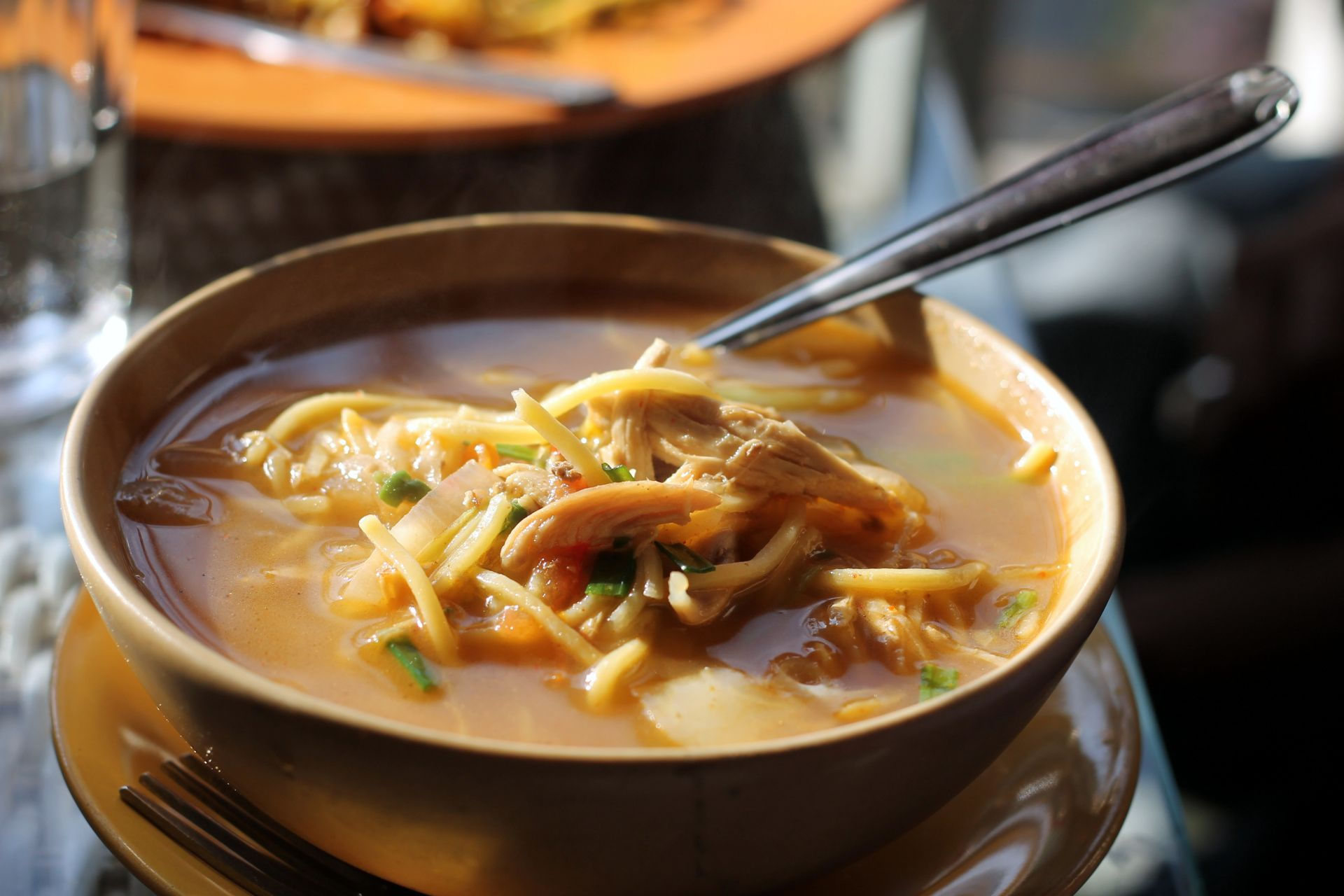
A bowl of Thukpa

- Dre-thuk – includes yak or sheep soup stock along with rice, different types of Tibetan cheeses and droma, a type of Tibetan root
- Guthuk – a noodle soup in Tibetan cuisine that is eaten two days before Losar, the Tibetan New Year (Note: "Guthuk is a special dish prepared for the Losar celebration. In it are dumplings that contain omens: a pebble symbolizes a long, healthy life; cayenne pepper suggests that the individual has a temperamental personality; a piece of charcoal ...")
- Qoiri – a stew of mutton chops, made with flour, shredded wheat, chillies, dry curd cheese, water and salt
- Thenthuk – hand pulled noodle soup
- Thukpa – a noodle soup that originated in the eastern part of Tibet. Thupka has been described as a "generic Tibetan word for any soup or stew combined with noodles."
- Bhakthuk – a common Tibetan cuisine noodle soup that includes small bhasta noodles
- Tsam-thuk – prepared with yak or sheep soup stock and tsampa (roasted barley flour) as well as a variety of Tibetan cheeses

== See also ==
- Beer in Tibet
- Tibetan culture
- Sikkimese cuisine
