= Gyurma =

Tibetan blood sausage

Gyurma is a blood sausage made with yak or sheep's blood in Tibetan cuisine. Rice or roasted barley flour can be added as filler. The sausage uses natural yak or sheep casing (intestine). This sausage is also consumed in the regions of Sikkim, Bhutan, Uttrakhand and Ladakh in India and Himalayan regions of Nepal.

== See also ==
- Kargyong
- Kaszanka
- Black pudding
- Lap Cheong
- List of Tibetan dishes
