= De-Thuk =

Tibetan soup

De-Thuk is a Tibetan cuisine soup that includes yak or sheep soup stock along with rice, different types of Tibetan cheeses and droma, a type of Tibetan root. The rice is cooked with much water or stock to reach a consistency similar to Cantonese rice congee.

== See also ==
- List of soups
- List of Tibetan dishes
