= Butter tea =

South Asian and Tibetan drink

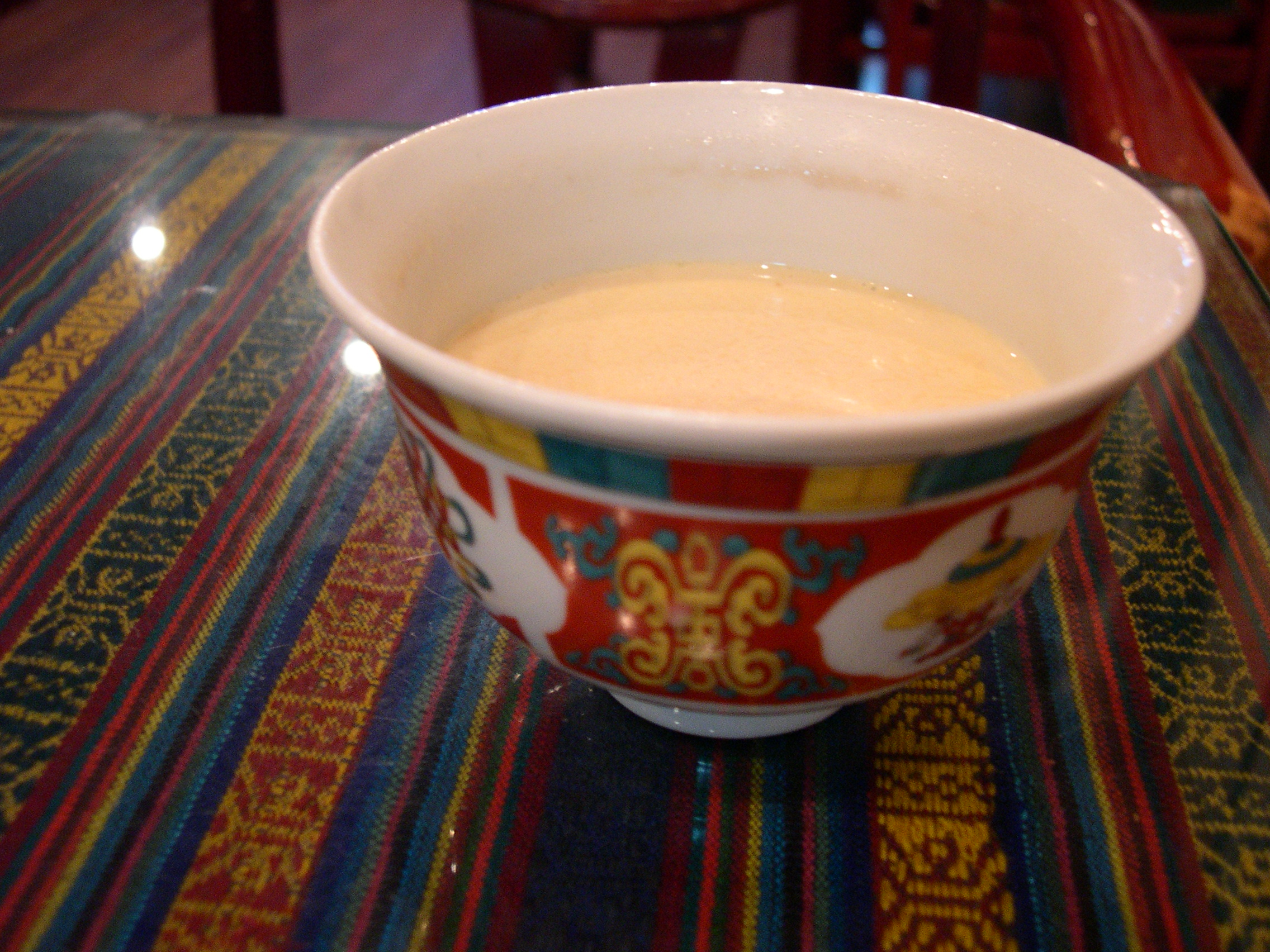
- Butter tea in a bowl
- Alternative names: Boe cha, cha süma, goor goor cha, cha suskan
- Type: Beverage
- Place of origin: Central Asia, Tibet, China
- Region or state: South/Central/East Asia
- Main ingredients: Tea leaves, yak butter, salt

Butter tea (Note: Also known as bho jha or po cha (Tibetan: བོད་ཇ་, Wylie: bod ja, THL: bö ja, "Tibetan tea"), cha süma (Tibetan: ཇ་སྲུབ་མ་, Wylie: ja srub ma, THL: ja sup ma, "churned tea") in Standard Tibetan, sūyóu chá (酥油茶) in Mandarin Chinese, su ja (Tibetan script: སུ་ཇ, Wylie: suja, "churned tea") in Dzongkha, cha su-kan or gur gur cha in the Ladakhi language, and su chya or phe chya in the Sherpa language. In Xinjiang it is known as etken chay (Uyghur: ئەتكەن چاي, әткән чай).) is a drink of the people in the Himalayan regions of Nepal, Bhutan, India, Pakistan especially in Khyber Pakhtunkhwa and Gilgit-Baltistan, Afghanistan, Kazakhstan, Uzbekistan, Tajikistan, Xinjiang, Tibet, and western regions of modern-day China and Central Asia. Traditionally, it is made from tea leaves, yak butter, water, and salt, although butter made from cow's milk is increasingly used, given its wider availability and lower cost. It is sometimes consumed with tsampa (roasted barley flour).

== History ==
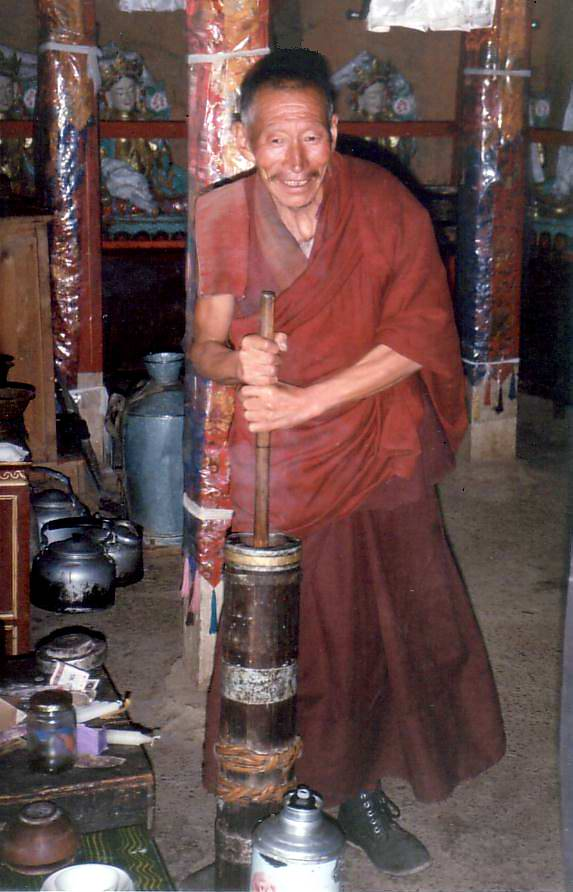
Tibetan monk churning butter tea

The history of tea in Tibet dates back to the 7th century during the Tang dynasty. However, butter tea did not become popular in Tibet until about the 13th century, the time of the Phagmodrupa dynasty.

According to legend, a Chinese princess married a king of Tibet which later helped establish trade routes between China and Tibet. These trade routes brought tea into Tibet from China. Later, butter was added to the tea that was brought from China as butter is and was a staple in Tibetan cuisine.

By the 8th century, it was common to drink tea in Tibet. In the 13th century, tea was then used in Tibetan religious ceremonies.

Today, butter tea is still prevalent in Tibet.

== Preparation ==
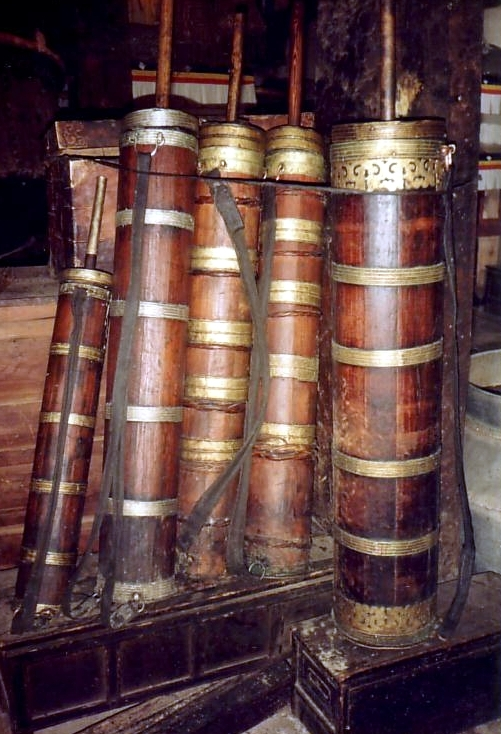
Butter tea churns, Sera Monastery, Tibet

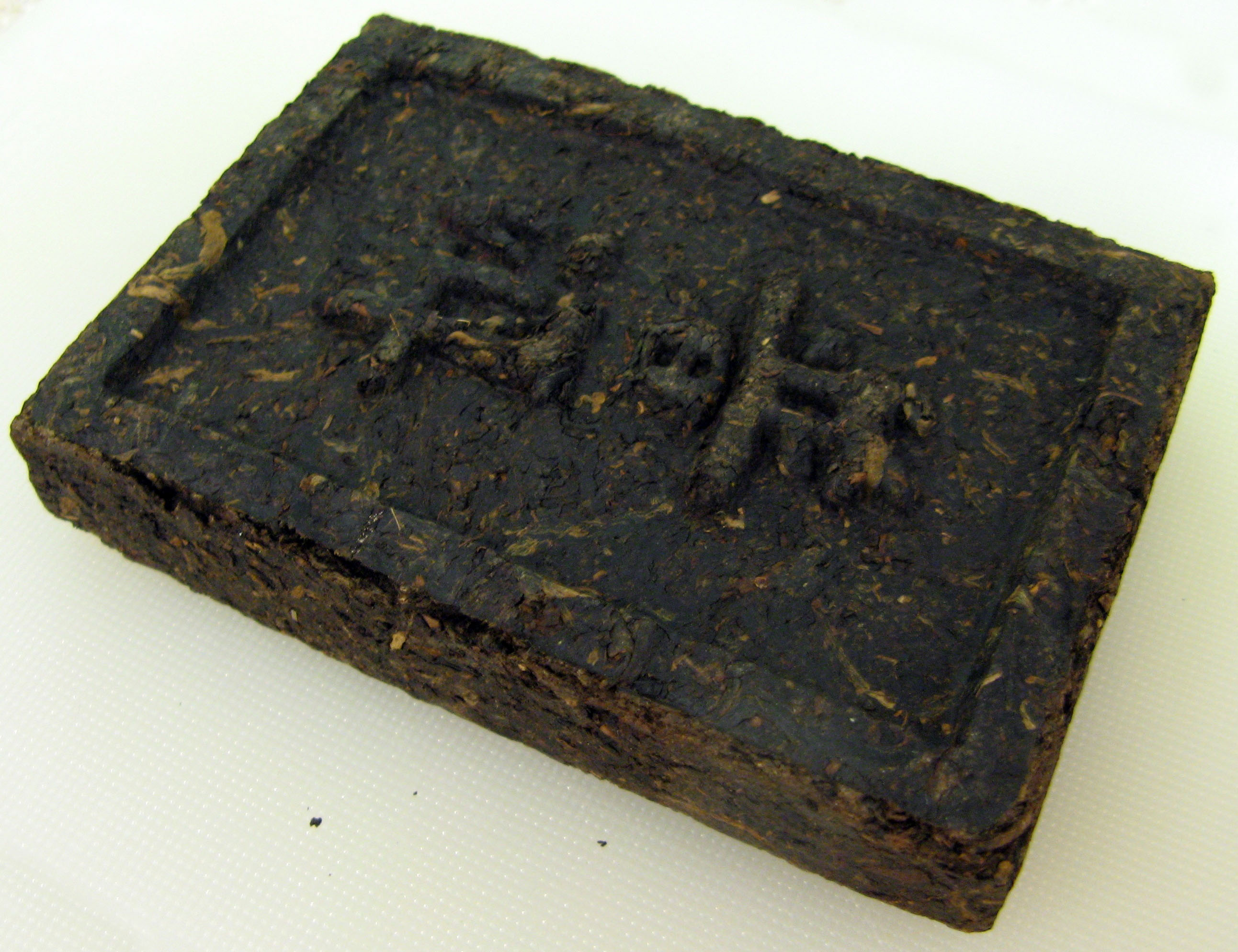
Pu-erh tea brick with Chinese characters molded on top

The highest quality of butter tea is made by boiling pu-erh tea leaves in water for half a day, achieving a dark brown color. It is then skimmed, and poured into a cylinder with fresh yak butter and salt which is then shaken. The result is a liquid that is about the thickness of a stew or thick oil. It is then poured into teapots or jars.

Another method is to boil water and add handfuls of the tea into the water, which is allowed to steep until it turns almost black. Salt is then added, along with a little soda if wanted. The tea is then strained through a horse-hair or reed colander into a wooden butter churn, and a large lump of butter is added. This is then churned until the tea reaches the proper consistency and transferred to copper pots that sit on a brazier to keep them warm. When a churn is not available, a wooden bowl and rapid stirring will suffice.

Each teapot and cup symbolize the standard of living of each family. A ceramic pot is the most widely used, while those made from copper or bronze may be used by families with a higher standard of living.

The Ganden Monastery in Lhasa, Tibet, prepares traditional butter tea for their population of monks each night. During this, they boil several bricks of tea in large cauldrons and use hundreds of kilograms of butter. Each step comes with its own prayer. Once the tea is ready, one monk sounds the gong to let others know the tea is ready.

Nowadays, when tea leaves, yak butter, and wooden butter churns are not available, people often make butter tea using tea bags, different types of butter available in the market, and a blender to churn.

The concentrate, produced by repeatedly boiling tea leaves, will keep for several days and is commonly used in towns. The tea is then combined with salt and butter in a special tea churn (Tibetan: མདོང་མོ་, Wylie: mdong mo), and churned vigorously before serving hot. Now an electric blender is often used.

== Customs ==
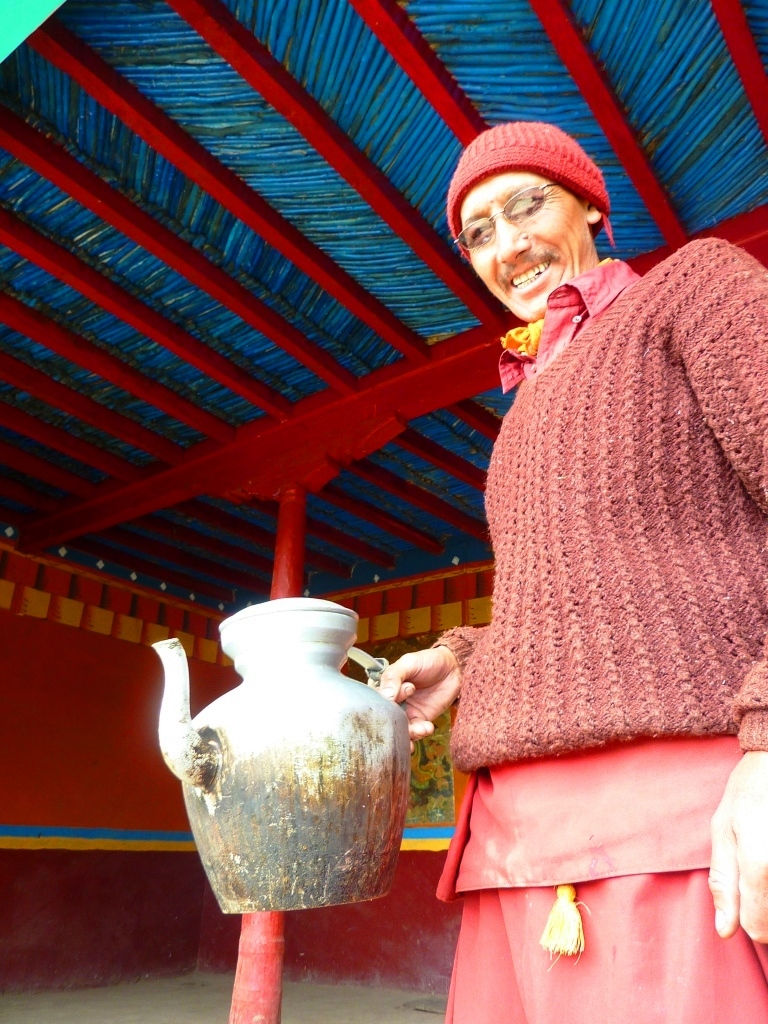
Monk with pot of butter tea at monastery

Drinking butter tea is a regular part of Tibetan life. Before work, a Tibetan will typically enjoy several bowlfuls of this beverage, and it is always served to guests. The butter may also help prevent chapped lips.

It provides high calorific energy and is particularly suited for the cold high-altitude Himalayan climate.

=== Consumption ===
According to the Tibetan custom, butter tea is drunk in separate sips, and after each sip, the host refills the bowl to the brim. Thus, the guest never drains his bowl; it is constantly topped up. If the visitor does not wish to drink, the best thing to do is leave the tea untouched until the time comes to leave and then drain the bowl. In this way, etiquette is observed and the host will not be offended.

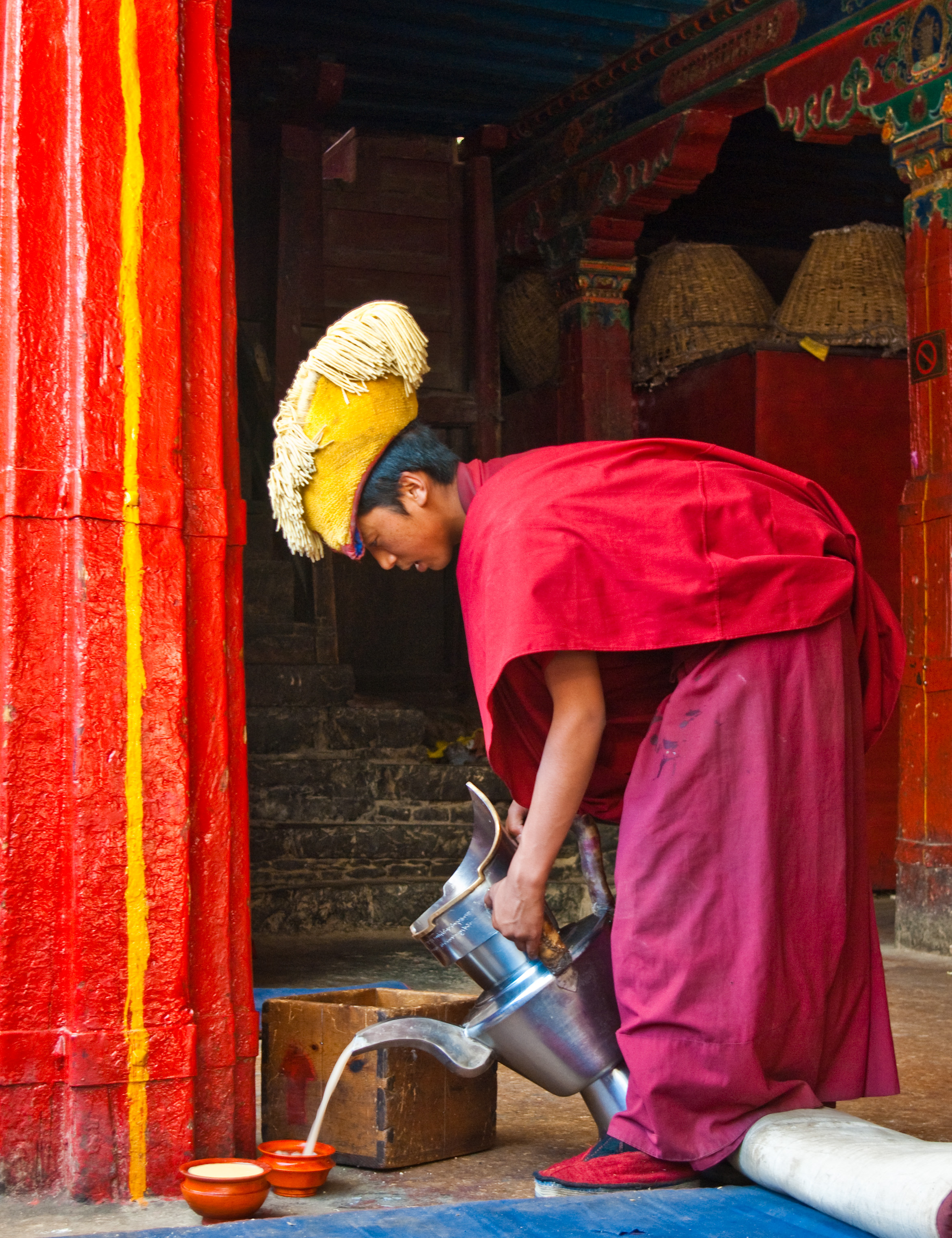
Monk from Tashilhunpo pouring butter tea

Butter tea is also used for eating tsampa by pouring onto it, or dipping the tsampa into it, and mixing well.

=== Occasions ===
Although there is no formal ceremony for the preparation of the tea, butter tea is drunk at different Tibetan ceremonies. During a proper Sherpa funeral ceremony, it is custom for the deceased's relatives to invite the guests into their house with a cup of butter tea. During the Tibetan New Year, Losar, ceremonies last for three days in the monasteries. Prior to their long prayers in the afternoon, monks start the morning with butter tea and sweet rice.

Butter tea in Bhutanese culture is also drunk at special occasions such as weddings and Losar. When being hosted, guests are also typically served Suja along with Zao, puffed rice roasted with butter and sugar.

Another custom recognized by Tibetans is celebrating the birth of their children a few days after the child's birth to dissolve the bad luck the child brings from its mother's womb. Usually the celebration is attended by the parents' friends and relatives, who bring the child gifts including yak butter tea.

=== Religion ===
Tibetan Buddhism is a common practice and due to such beliefs the yak butter used in the tea is held in high regard such as Karma Palmo. The Tibetan monks would consume the butter tea twice a day and on occasion enjoy the beverage with paksuma, a special rice porridge.

== See also ==
- Masala chai
- Noon chai
- Bulletproof Coffee
- List of butter dishes
- List of Tibetan dishes
- Suutei tsai
- Tibetan cuisine
