= Papza Mogu =

Tibetan dish

papza mogu
- Place of origin: China
- Region or state: Tibet
- Main ingredients: dough, butter, brown sugar, curd cheese

In Tibetan cuisine, papza mogu is a dough shaped into balls with melted butter, brown sugar, and dry curd cheese. It gives a sweet and sour taste and is red in color.

== See also ==
- List of Tibetan dishes
