= Dave Asprey =

American entrepreneur and author (born 1973)

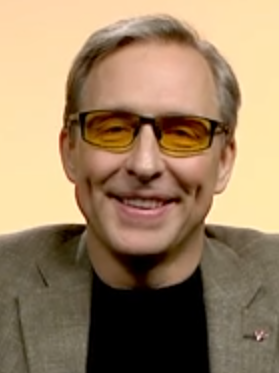
- Asprey in December 2018
- Born: 1973 (age 52–53); Albuquerque, New Mexico
- Known for: Bulletproof Coffee and the Bulletproof diet
- Website: www.bulletproof.com

Dave Asprey (born 1973) is an American entrepreneur, author and advocate of a low-carbohydrate, high-fat diet known as the Bulletproof diet, about which he has made claims criticized by dietitians as pseudoscientific. He founded Bulletproof 360, Inc. in 2013, and in 2014, founded Bulletproof Nutrition Inc. Men's Health described Asprey as a "lifestyle guru".

Asprey is known for his early adoption of the Internet for commerce, selling caffeine-molecule t-shirts via the alt.drugs.caffeine newsgroup in 1994, and for his promotion of the "biohacker" movement. Previously, Asprey held executive and director positions for technology companies including Trend Micro, Blue Coat Systems, and Citrix Systems.

== Career ==
Asprey worked in the IT industry for companies that included Bradshaw and 3Com. He taught and ran the Internet and web engineering program at the UCSC Silicon Valley Extension, in which Asprey created one of the first working instances of cloud computing. Later, he joined Exodus Communications as director of strategic planning, where he co-founded the company's professional services group.

His first startup was an early-stage e-commerce company founded around 1993, which was featured in Entrepreneur magazine. Eventually, the company delivered products to customers in ten countries, including Australia, the United Kingdom, South Africa, and several parts of Asia, making it one of the first worldwide e-commerce businesses.

Asprey was the director of product management for a Silicon Valley startup called NetScaler, which was later acquired by Citrix Systems. After working at Citrix, Asprey served as the vice president of marketing for Zeus Technology and later, vice president of technology and corporate development at Blue Coat Systems. He then became an entrepreneur in residence at Trinity Ventures before co-founding a company called Basis. Asprey was the vice president of cloud security for Trend Micro before he left to run his own business full time.

=== Bulletproof ===
Asprey founded Bulletproof 360, Inc. in 2013 and founded Bulletproof Nutrition Inc. in 2014. He initially started the Bulletproof brand after developing Bulletproof Coffee. He posted the recipe for the beverage and details on the health benefits he experienced on his website while still working for Trend Micro. Asprey developed "low-mold coffee beans", oils, and supplements and started selling them on his website in 2011. The following year, Asprey was a panelist at the "Hack Your Brain" event at South by Southwest. By 2013, Asprey had left his position at Trend Micro to run the Bulletproof companies.

Asprey hosts a podcast, Bulletproof Radio, which had been downloaded more than 75 million times as of January 2019. The stated goal of Bulletproof Nutrition is to enhance human performance. It supports the Quantified Self movement as a way to empower individuals to understand and 'hack' their own health.

In 2014, Asprey authored The Bulletproof Diet, published by Rodale Books, and in 2015 opened a cafe in Santa Monica selling Bulletproof Coffee and high-fat foods. In July 2015, Asprey raised $9 million from Trinity Ventures to expand the company.

In July 2018, Bulletproof 360, Inc. reported raising more than $40 million in equity and debt financing, led by the food and beverage investment firm CAVU Venture Partners. Other investors in the round were Trinity Ventures and Silicon Valley Bank. In Sept, 2019, Bulletproof announced that Asprey had stepped down as CEO but would continue to focus on his role as executive chairman. In September 2021, Asprey announced franchising his new venture, Upgrade Labs.

== Bulletproof diet ==
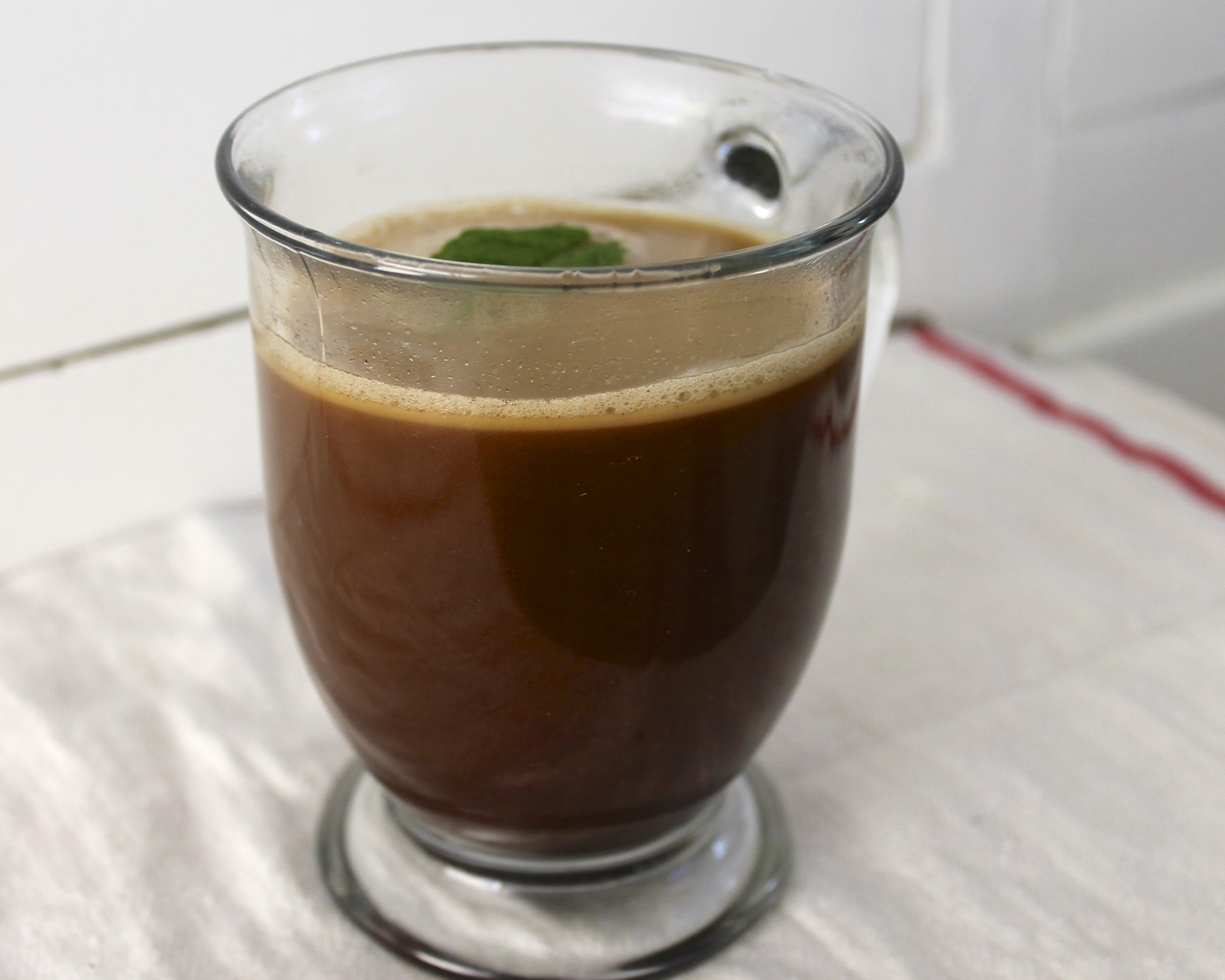
A cup of Bulletproof Coffee

The Bulletproof diet developed and marketed by Asprey recommends eating foods high in fat, moderate in protein, and low in carbohydrates with a foundation being the consumption of Bulletproof Coffee, a brand of coffee made and marketed by Asprey. Asprey developed this recipe after traveling to Tibet and drinking yak-butter tea. He returned to the United States and experimented with buttered drink recipes and published the preparation for his buttered coffee drink on his blog in 2009. The Bulletproof diet promotes the consumption of grass-fed beef and butter and considers soy, wheat, canned vegetables and microwaved foods to be toxic, but fails to provide any evidence to support these claims. It also recommends incorporating intermittent fasting.

Asprey has claimed that when used in combination with other "health hacks", the coffee helped to boost his IQ score by more than 20 points, but failed to provide any evidence to support this claim. Asprey warns coffee drinkers to avoid mold toxins such as ochratoxin in coffee. Asprey asserts that mycotoxins are harmful substances produced by coffee-bean-growing molds (among other things) and they are responsible for a wide range of health issues, including inflammation. He promotes his Bulletproof-brand "Upgraded Coffee" alleged to omit mycotoxins. Physician David Bach says that coffee producers are already able to remove mycotoxins from their products and that there is no evidence to support Asprey's claim that mycotoxins make people "sluggish".

=== Reception ===
Critics have described the Bulletproof diet as simplistic, invalid and unscientific. Asprey has no medical degree or nutritional training. The British Dietetic Association have listed the Bulletproof diet as an example of a fad diet. Stephan Guyenet reviewing the book for Red Pen Reviews commented that although some of the Bulletproof diet's advice such as eating whole foods and avoiding processed foods is healthful, "much of the dietary advice presented in the book seems either based on a superficial understanding of nutritional science or a complete rejection of it."

Vox contributor Julia Belluz criticized the Bulletproof diet referring to it as "like a caricature of a bad fad-diet book". Belluz wrote particularly against claims that changing diet can reduce inflammation and lead to weight loss, saying Asprey ignored contradictory studies about the health benefits of certain foods, and inappropriately extrapolated studies on animals, very small groups of people, and people with specific diseases to the general human population.

Dietitian Lynn Weaver criticized the diet as being hard to follow and supported by only small studies that are "not generally part of the scientific literature used by medical and nutritional professionals". Dietitians also point out there is no scientific basis for claims of an IQ boost, and that any sense of alertness from Bulletproof Coffee is "just a caffeine buzz".

Asprey has been accused of making false health claims about his vitamin products to prevent and treat COVID-19. An article by Scott Gavura commented that "Asprey’s output combines cherry-picked science with pseudoscience, wrapped up in a self-experimentation ethos that superficially sounds compelling but falls short in actual evidence". In 2020, the Federal Trade Commission sent Asprey a warning letter telling him any "coronavirus-related prevention claims regarding such products are not supported by competent and reliable scientific evidence. You must immediately cease making all such claims".

In 2021, the Food and Drug Administration (FDA) sent a warning letter to Asprey's company, Bulletproof 360, stating that its products were "not generally recognized as safe and effective” for the uses advertised.

== Personal life ==
Asprey tried a vegan diet for six months in the early 2000s, but then returned to eating animal source foods. He has criticized veganism, stating that it can increase the risk of vitamin B12 deficiency and has suggested that it is "hard to get enough high-quality protein on a vegan diet". Asprey promotes the consumption of organic, grass-fed meat.

Asprey has stated that he expects to live to one hundred eighty years of age. As of 2021, he claims to have spent at least two million dollars on "hacking his own biology", including having his own stem cells injected into himself, taking one hundred daily supplements, following a strict diet, bathing in infrared light, using a hyperbaric oxygen chamber, and wearing special lenses when flying or using a computer. Asprey believes such "biohacking" has benefited his sexual health, having kept an ejaculation journal for a year.

Asprey met his wife, Lana Asprey, a physician, at an anti-aging conference, and they lived in Vancouver Island, Canada. He claimed that following the Bulletproof diet helped his wife with her polyendocrine metabolic ovarian syndrome (PMOS). In 2021, Asprey and Lana divorced, after which Asprey moved from his thirty-two–acre farm in Canada to Austin, Texas.

Asprey supported President Donald Trump's nomination of Robert F. Kennedy Jr. to United States secretary of health and human services (HHS). He expressed hope that Kennedy would remove FDA regulations, believing that doing so would lead to a "dawning of a new age of biohacking". He echoed Kennedy's distrust of research funded by "Big Pharma", stating, “I want the right to look at all the data, and I want the right to make the decision of what works for me.”

== Bibliography ==
- The Better Baby Book (2013) co-authored with his wife Lana Asprey, ASIN B00DNL3I7K
- The Bulletproof Diet (2014), ISBN 162336518X, 978-1623365189
- Headstrong (2017), ISBN 9780062652416, 978-0062652416
- Game Changers: What Leaders, Innovators, and Mavericks Do to Win at Life (2018), ISBN 0062652443, 978-0062652447
- Super Human: The Bulletproof Plan to Age Backward and Maybe Even Live Forever (2019), ISBN 0062882821, 978-0062882820
- Fast This Way: Burn Fat, Heal Inflammation, and Eat Like the High-Performing Human You Were Meant to Be (2021), ISBN 0062882864, 978-0062882868
- Smarter Not Harder: The Biohacker’s Guide to Getting the Body and Mind You Want (2023), ISBN 006320472X, 978-0008625924
