= Chetang Goiche =

Tibetan dish

In Tibetan cuisine, chetang goiche are strips of dough, fried with rapeseed oil and brown sugar.

== See also ==
- List of Tibetan dishes
