= Qoiri =

Tibetan stew

- Type: Stew
- Place of origin: Tibet
- Main ingredients: Mutton chops, flour, shredded wheat, chillies, dry curd cheese, water, salt

In Tibetan cuisine, Qoiri is a stew made with mutton chops, flour, shredded wheat, chillies, dry curd cheese, water, and salt. The Moinba people of southwestern Tibet often enhance the dish by incorporating a stronger cheese and additional ingredients like wild mushrooms and fungi.

== See also ==
- List of stews
- List of Tibetan dishes
