= Lunggoi Katsa =

Tibetan sheep's head dish

- Type: Stew
- Place of origin: Tibet
- Main ingredients: Sheep's head, curry, fennel, monosodium glutamate, salt

In Tibetan cuisine, Lunggoi Katsa (ལུག་མགོ།་ཁ་ཚ) is stewed sheep's head, with curry, fennel, monosodium glutamate and salt.

== See also ==
- List of lamb dishes
- List of stews
- List of Tibetan dishes
