= Sepen (sauce) =

Tibetan hot sauce

Sepen is a Tibetan cuisine hot sauce made with chillies as the primary ingredient and other spices depending on the recipe. It can be made on a tomato base or can include vegetables like onion and celery. It exists in both thick and chunky versions as well as smooth ones. It can be served with all meals and is used to spice the usually mild Tibetan food.

== See also ==
- List of Tibetan dishes
