= Thenthuk =

Tibetan noodle soup

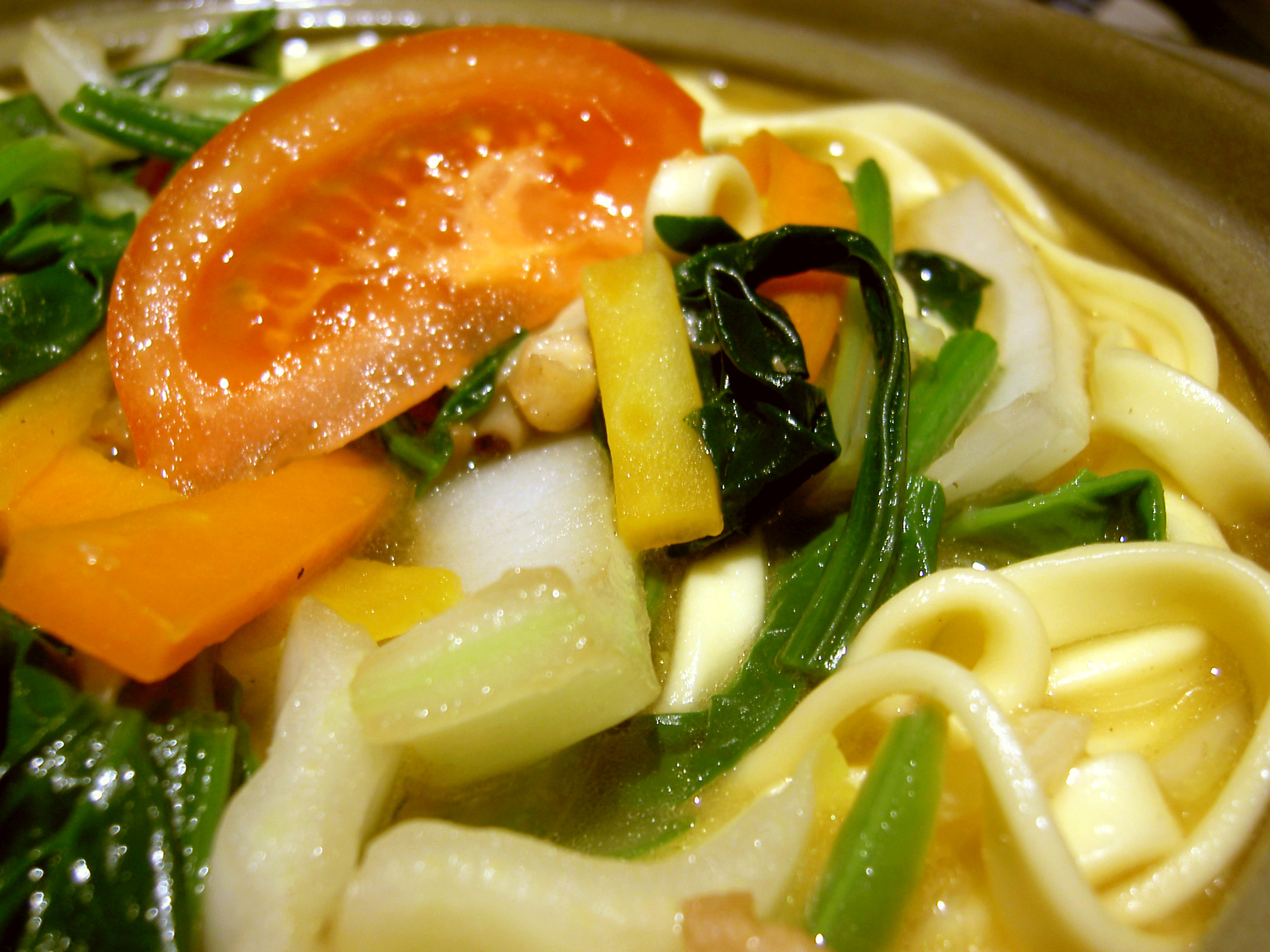
- Thukpa - noodle soup of which thentuk is a type
- Type: Noodle soup
- Place of origin: Amdo, Tibet
- Region or state: Tibet, Nepal, Qinghai, Sikkim, Sichuan, Arunachal Pradesh
- Created by: Tibetan people
- Main ingredients: Wheat flour, vegetables, meat (mutton or yak)

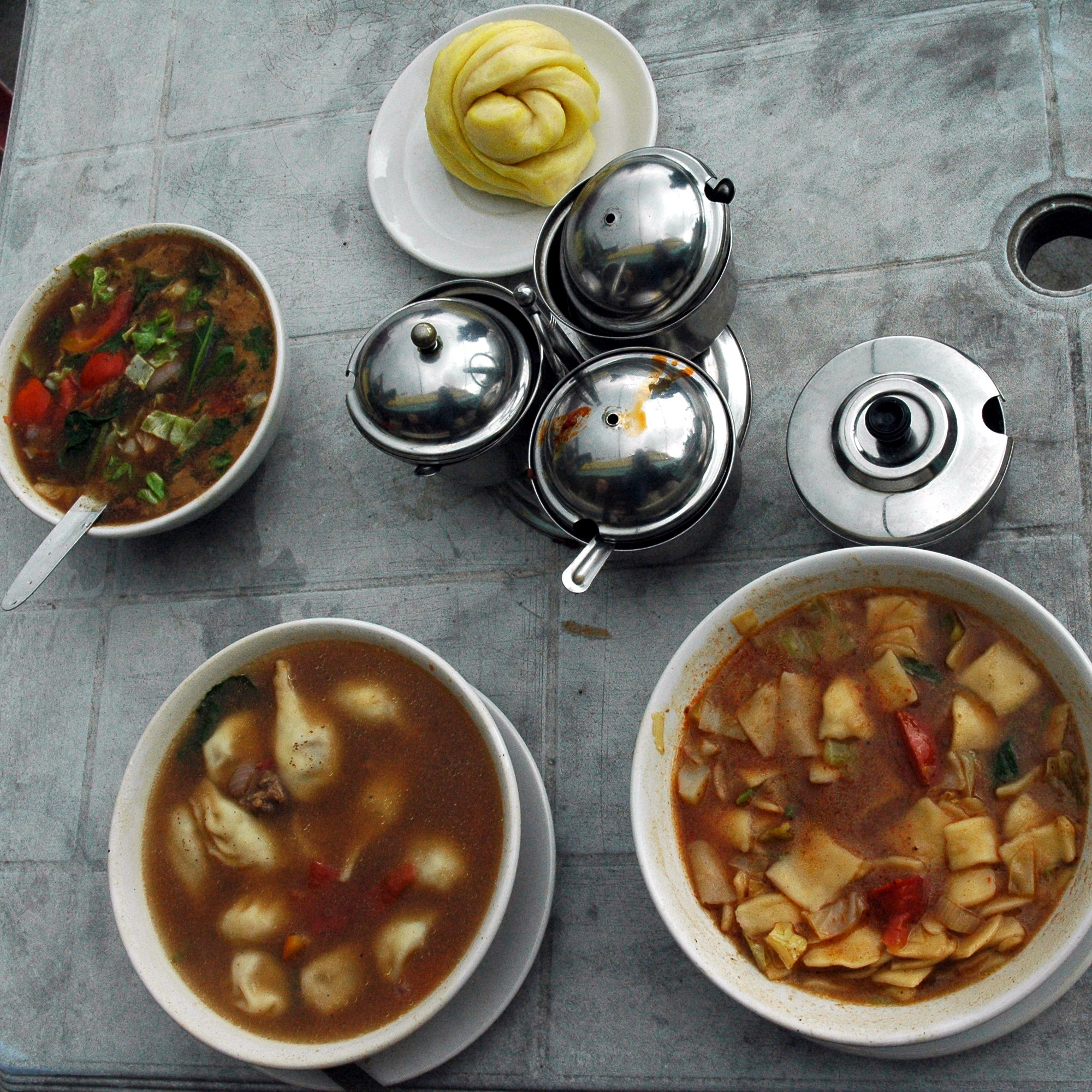
Tibetan meal (clockwise from top) tingmo steamed bread, thenthuk noodle soup, momos in soup and vegetable gravy, with condiments in center

Thenthuk (Tibetan: འཐེན་ཐུག་, Wylie: then thug) or hand-pulled noodle soup (thukpa), is a very common noodle soup in Tibetan cuisine, especially in Amdo, Tibet where it is served as dinner and sometimes lunch. The main ingredients are wheat flour dough, mixed vegetables and some pieces of mutton or yak meat. Vegetable thenthuk is a common modern-day option too.

== Preparation ==
Making the soup consists of mixing the flour, kneading the dough, chopping the vegetables and meat and boiling the soup.

The cook starts working with the dough when everything boiling in the soup is well cooked. They shape the dough, flatten it, pull it and cut it off, right into the boiling soup. As soon as this is finished, the noodle soup is ready to cool down and be served.

== Nepalese thukpa ==
The Nepalese version of thukpa (Nepali: थुक्पा) contains chili powder, masalas, and noodles with gram and pea soup which gives it a hot and spicy flavor. The most typical Nepali thukpa is found in Sankhuwasabha district. However, the thukpa found in Kathmandu Valley is the same as that found in Tibet due to immigrant Tibetan refugees.

== See also ==
- List of soups
- List of Tibetan dishes
