= Thukpa =

Tibetan noodle soup

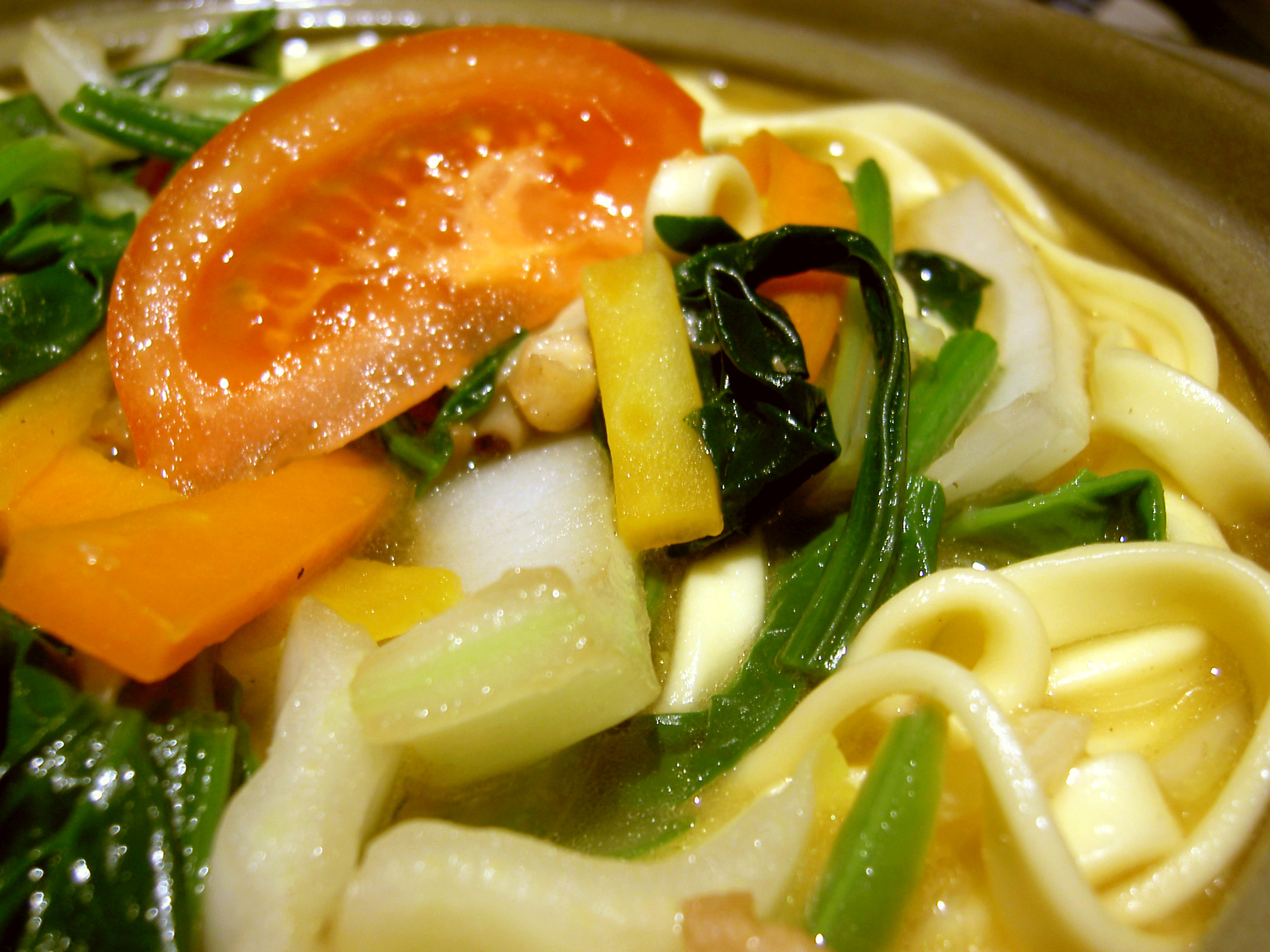
- Thukpa, a dish from Ladakh
- Type: Soup
- Place of origin: China
- Region or state: China, Nepal
- Associated cuisine: Tibetan cuisine
- Main ingredients: Vegetables

Thukpa (Tibetan: ཐུག་པ; IPA: /tʰu(k̚)ˀ˥˥.pə˥˥/ ) is a Tibetan noodle soup, which originated in the eastern part of Tibet. Amdo thukpa, especially thenthuk, is a variant among Indians, especially Ladakhis and the Sikkimese. Thukpa can be prepared in both vegetarian and non-vegetarian variations; the most popular non-vegetarian variation includes chicken.

Varieties of thukpa include:

- Thenthuk (Tibetan: འཐེན་ཐུག་, Wylie: 'then thug): Hand-pulled noodle
- Gyathuk (Tibetan: རྒྱ་ཐུག་, Wylie: rgya thug): Chinese noodle
- Bhakthuk (Tibetan: བག་ཐུག་, Wylie: bag thug): Hand-rolled pinched noodle (like gnocchi)
- Tsapthuk (Tibetan: འབྲས་ཐུག་, Wylie: 'bras thug): chopped noodle

== Etymology ==
Thukpa has been described as a "generic Tibetan word for any soup or stew combined with noodles".

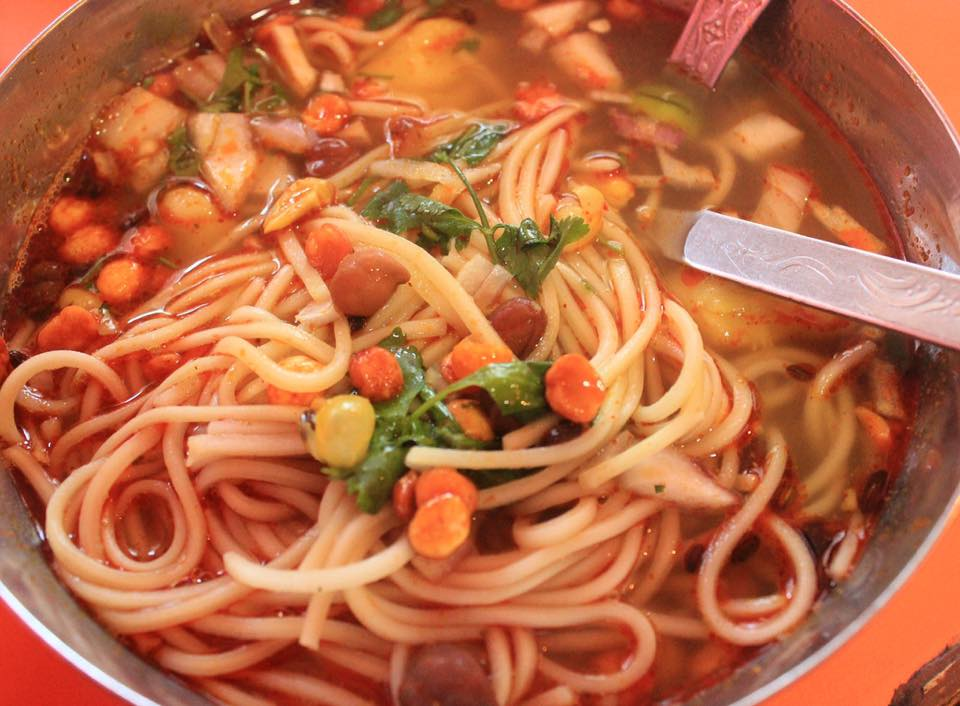
A Nepalese thukpa

== Regional traditions ==
=== Indian thukpa ===
In India, the dish is consumed by people of Nepalese and Tibetan origin in the state of Sikkim, Arunachal Pradesh, the district of Darjeeling and the union territory of Ladakh.

=== Nepalese thukpa ===
The Nepalese version of Thukpa has a predominant vegetarian feature and a bit of spicier flavor. The protein ingredients of the dish are given vegetarian alternatives according to availability, including beans, chickpeas, gram, kidney beans, etc. However, non-vegetarian thukpa are also enjoyed by non-vegetarians. Egg thukpa is probably the second most popular variety after vegetarian thukpa among Nepalese. Coriander leaves, spring onion, or garlic leaves are the popular Nepalese choices of garnish.

=== Bhutanese thukpa ===
The Bhutanese version of Thukpa tends to be sweeter than the Nepali version. It is very popular amongst tourists especially Indian and American tourists.

== Gallery ==
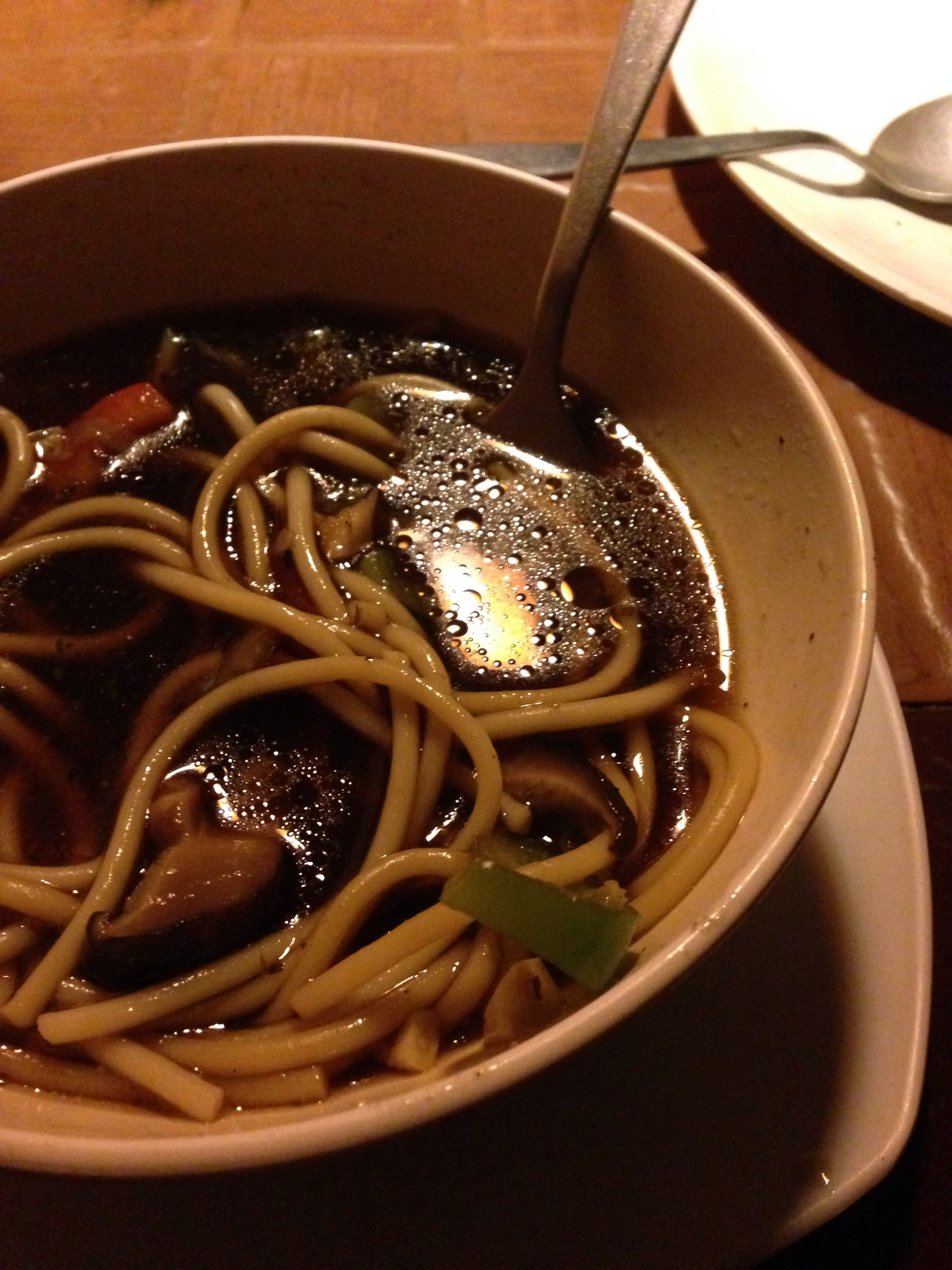

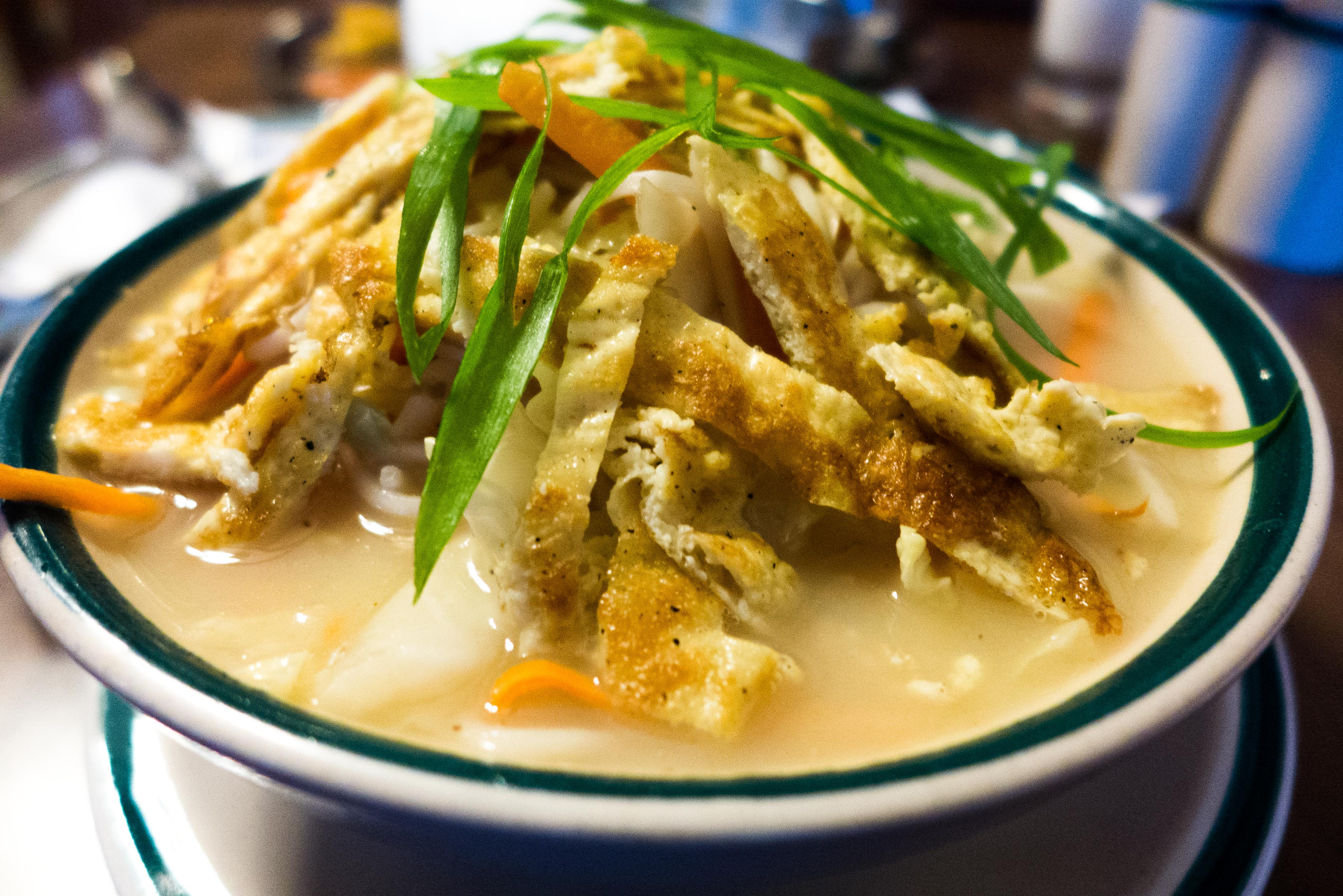

== See also ==
- Thukpa bhatuk
- List of soups
- List of Tibetan dishes
- List of Nepalese dishes
