= Sha phaley =

Tibetan stuffed bread dish

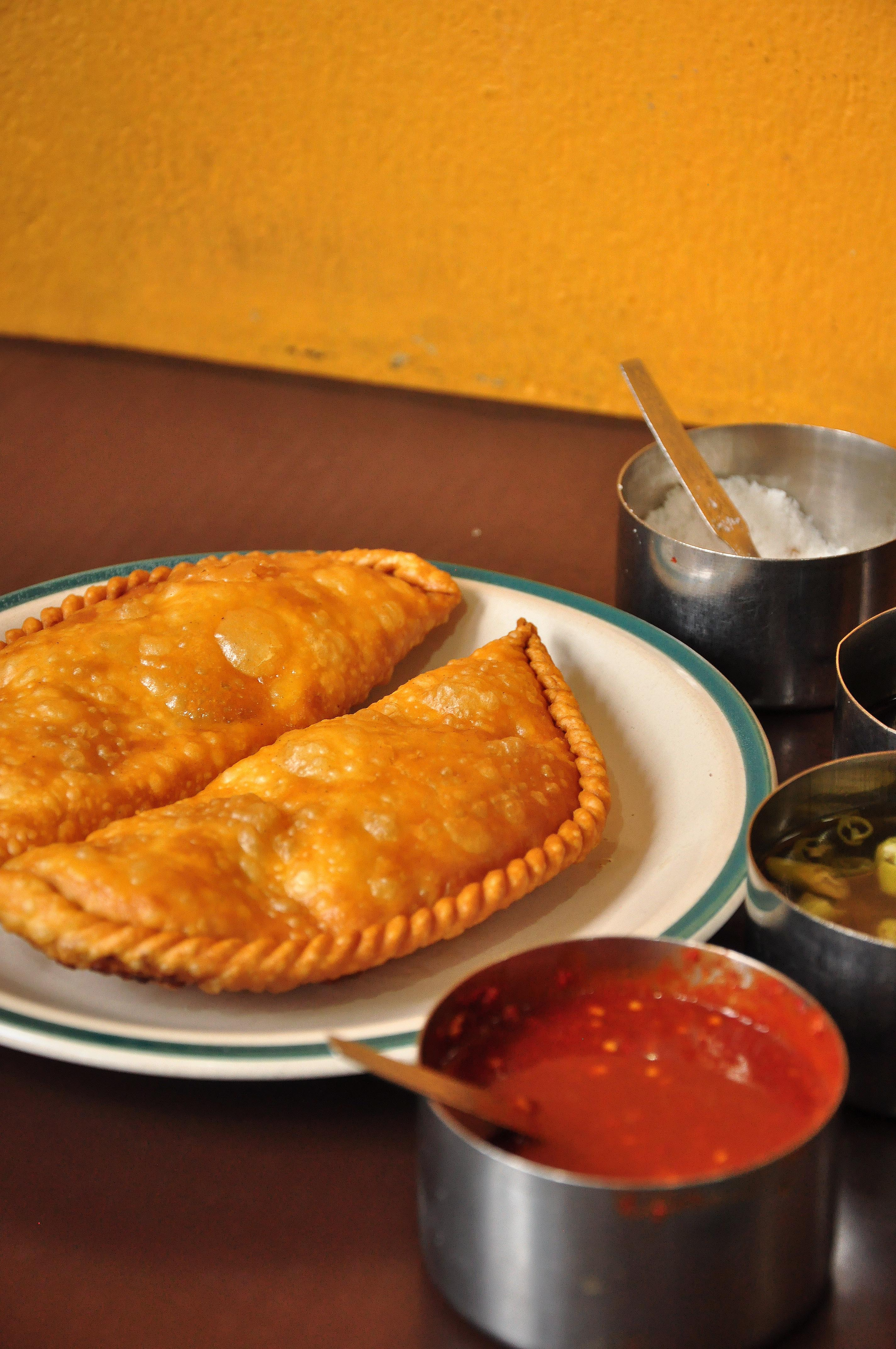
- Tibetan snack sha phaley or shabhaley in Nepal
- Alternative names: Shabhaley
- Type: Bread or pastry
- Place of origin: People's Republic of China
- Region or state: Tibet, Nepal, Sikkim, Ladakh, Arunachal Pradesh
- Main ingredients: Bread, beef, vegetables
- Other information: bhutan

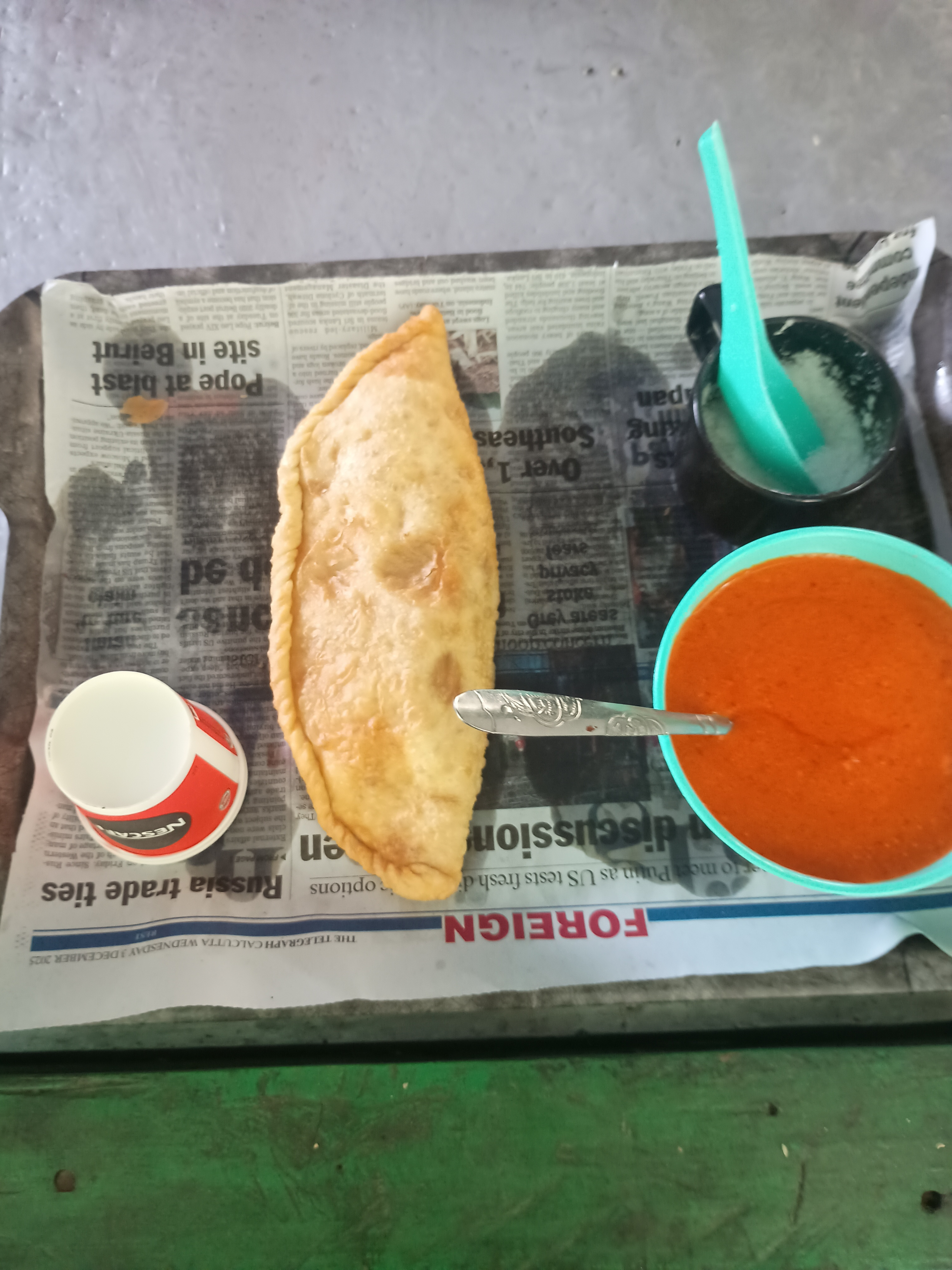
Sha Phaley (Shabhaley), a traditional Tibetan-style fried bread (Sikkim).

Sha phaley, also known as shabhalep (ཤ་བག་ལེབ།), is a Tibetan dish of bread stuffed with seasoned meat and cabbage, which is then fashioned into semi-circular or circular shapes, and is either deep-fried or pan-fried (like pot stickers) based on regional variations.

== See also ==
- Chebureki — a similar dish of Crimean origin in Slav culture
- List of Tibetan dishes
- Pastel - another similar dish
