= Thue (food) =

Tibetan dessert

Thue is a delicacy in Tibetan cuisine made with dri cheese (or sometimes parmesan or other hard cheeses), brown sugar (usually porang) and unsalted sweet cream butter. These ingredients are mixed together by hand into a smooth, slightly crumbly doughy mixture. It has a high butter content and is shaped in a thuedrom, a rectangular wooden frame about the size of a small brick. Thue is often topped with representations of the Moon and the Sun, carved out of butter while it is in a cold state. It is one of the few sweet Tibetan dishes and is eaten as a dessert on Losar and other special occasions like the Sho Dun Festival or on weddings.

== See also ==
- List of Tibetan dishes
