= Balep korkun =

Tibetan flatbread

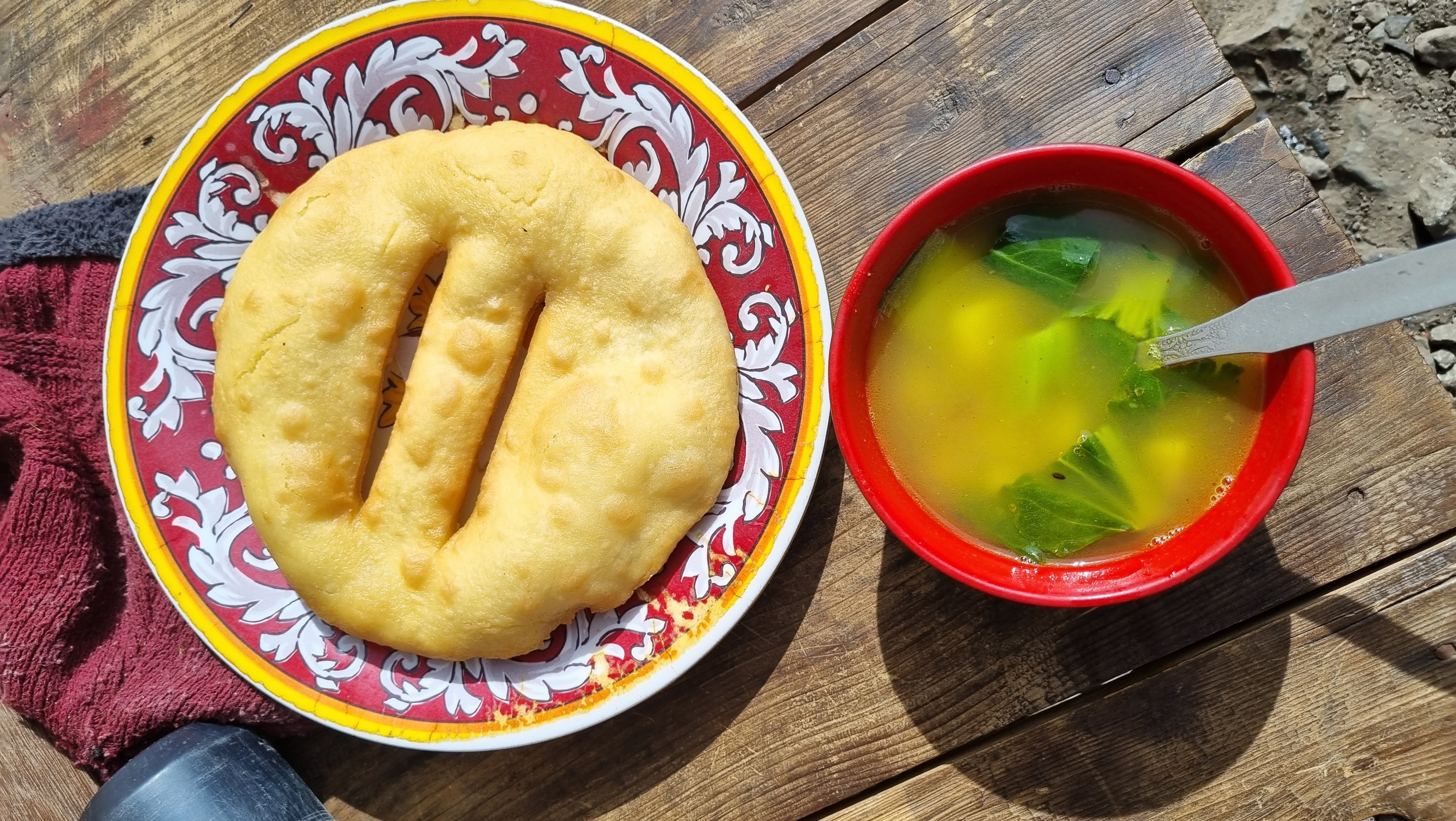
- Balep korkun, with veg soup.
- Alternative names: Tsampa Balep, Tibetan Flatbread
- Type: Flatbread
- Place of origin: Tibet
- Region or state: Amdo, Kham, U-Tsang
- Main ingredients: Tsampa, water, baking powder

Balep korkun or Yosang balep is a type of bread that is consumed mainly in central Tibet. It is round, flat and relatively easy to make. The ingredients are tsampa (barley flour), water and baking powder. It is cooked in a frying pan. It has been described as similar in appearance to naan.

== See also ==
- List of quick breads
- List of Tibetan dishes
