= Tingmo =

Tibetan bread

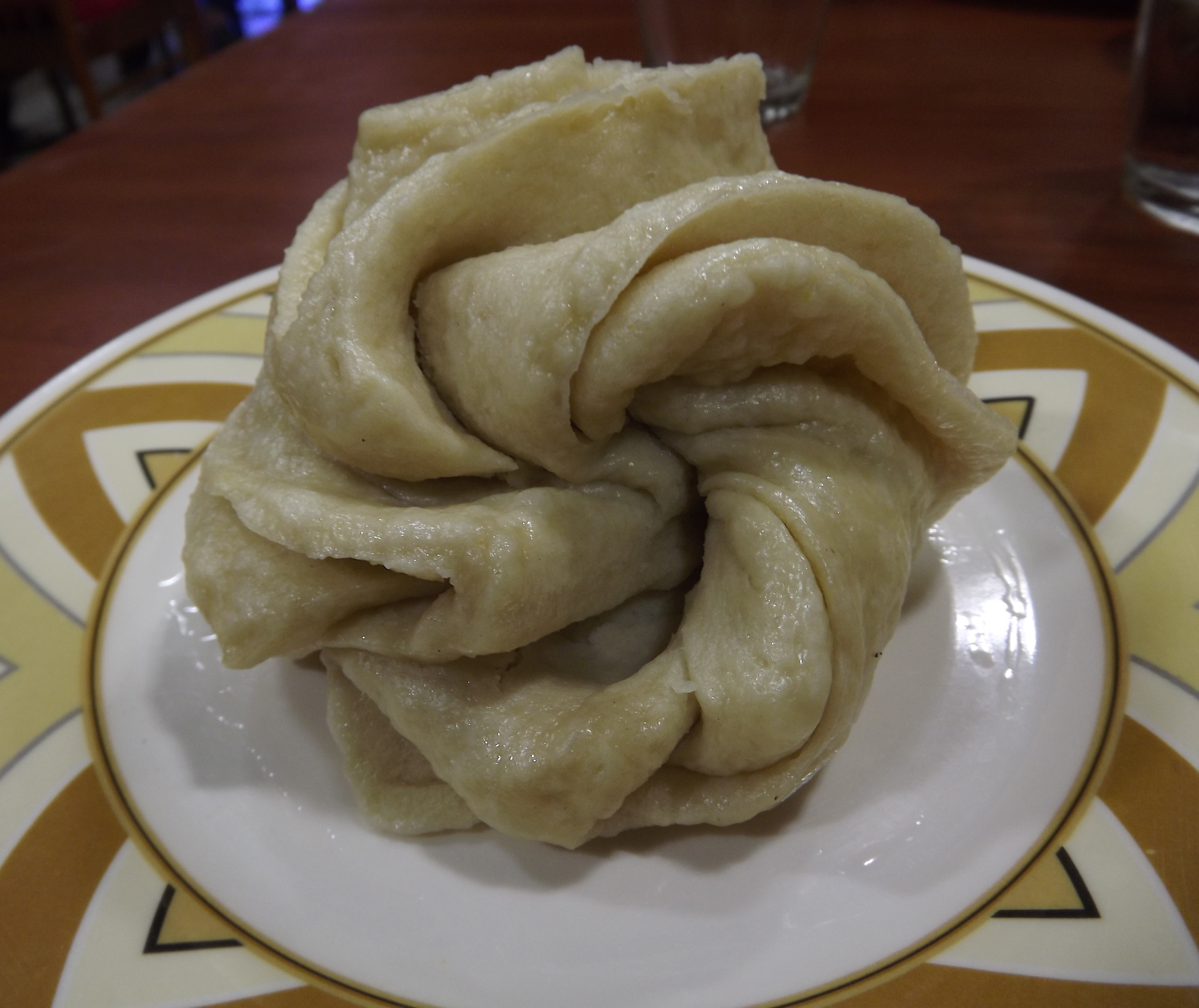
- Tingmo steamed bread
- Type: Filled steamed bread
- Place of origin: Tibet, China
- Region or state: Tibet
- Created by: Tibetan people
- Variations: Baozi

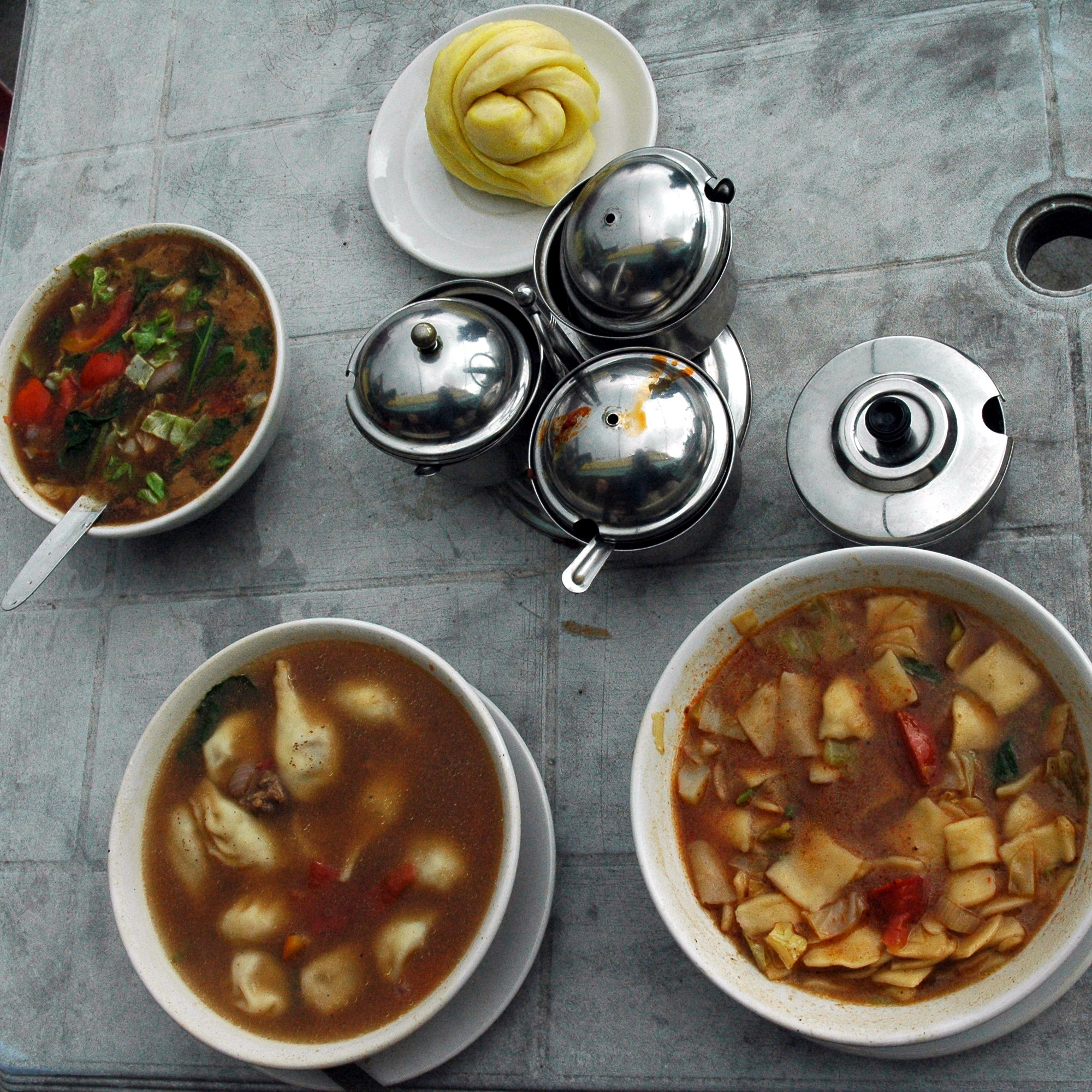
Clockwise from top: tingmo steamed bread, thenthuk noodle soup, momos in soup and vegetable gravy, with condiments in center from the Himalaya Restaurant, McLeod Ganj, Himachal Pradesh, India

Tingmo (Standard Tibetan: ཀྲིན་མོག) is a steamed bread in Tibetan cuisine. It is sometimes described as a steamed bun that is similar to Chinese flower rolls, with a soft and fluffy texture. It does not contain any kind of filling. A tingmo with some type of filling, like beef or chicken, is called a momo. Tingmo are often paired with vegetable dishes, meat dishes, dal dishes, and phing sha (a dish consisting of cellophane noodles, meat, and wood ear mushrooms). This dish can also be made by making twists and turns in the dough, so that it becomes more fluffy. It is speculated that the name "tingmo" is a contraction of "tinga" ("cloud" in the Tibetan language) and "momo" ("dumpling" in the Tibetan language).

== See also ==
- List of steamed foods
- List of Tibetan dishes
