= Kargyong =

Fermented sausage from Sikkim

Kargyong is a type of sausage, made with ginger, garlic and salt. It's a product of Sikkim where it is consumed by the Bhutia, Tibetan, Sherpa, Lepcha and Drukpa people mostly. It can be found in the local restaurants and fool stalls of Sikkim, the Darjeeling Himalayan hill region, Bhutan, Tibet and Ladakh. It is made with beef (lang kargyong), yak (yak kargyong) and pork (faak kargyong).

It's made with natural casing called gyuma and cooked by boiling, then it is smoked and dried for at least 10 days, but up to 15 days or more. The finished lang kargyong can be eaten boiled. It is also fried with onion, chillies, salt and onion to be used in curry. The fried sausage is also eaten plain with raksi liquor, or chhaang.

The microorganisms associated with kargyong include various types of lactobacilli, bacillus, micrococcus and staphylococcus, and some yeast and other fungal species with mycelia.
