= Yak butter =

Butter made from yak milk

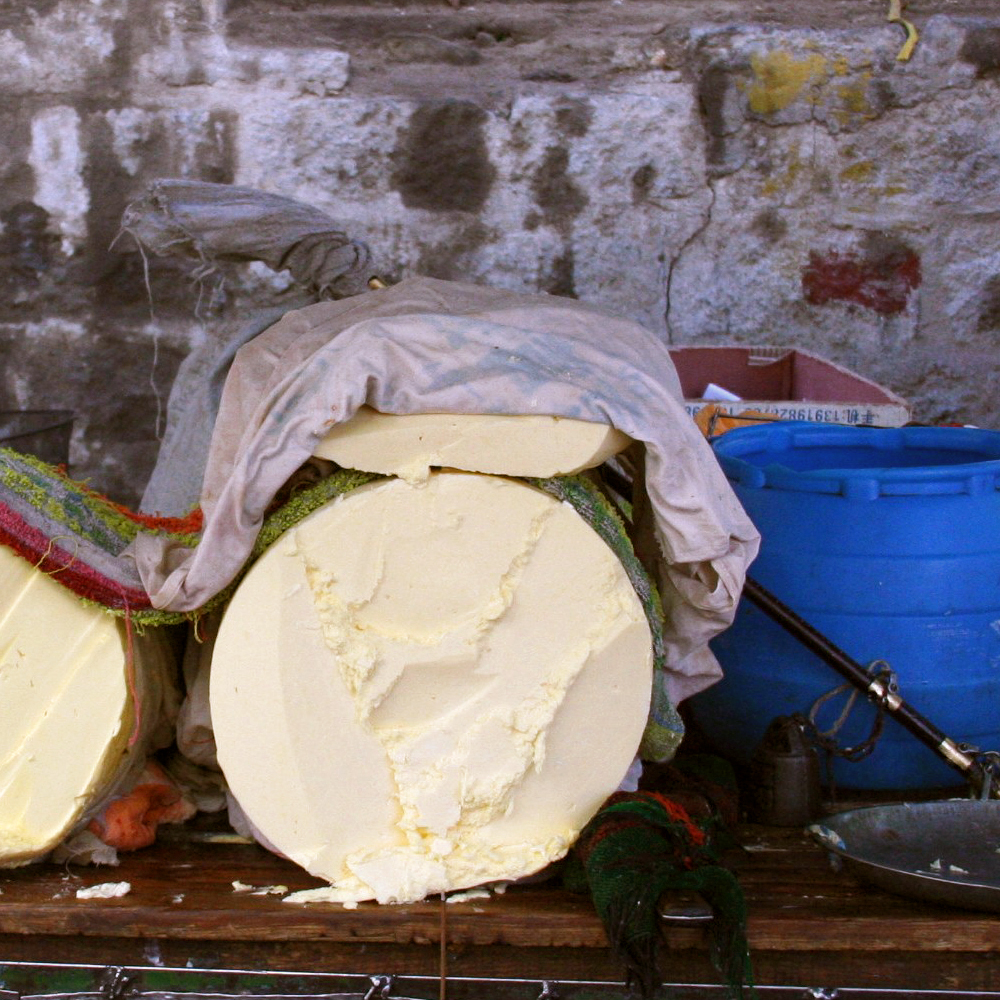
Yak butter for sale at a street market in Lhasa, Tibet, China (2011)

Yak butter (Standard Tibetan: འབྲི་མར།; Chinese: 酥油) is common in regions where the domestic yak is the primary source of dairy products. Whole yak's milk has nearly twice the fat content of whole cow's milk, producing butter with a texture closer to that of cheese. Among herder communities in Central, North, and East Asia, yak butter is a staple food and a trade commodity. It is integral to several culinary traditions in China (Tibet), India, Mongolia, Nepal, and Pakistan (Gilgit–Baltistan).

Fat Composition of Yak Butter (from Composition, quality and consumption of yak milk in Mongolia)

== Production ==
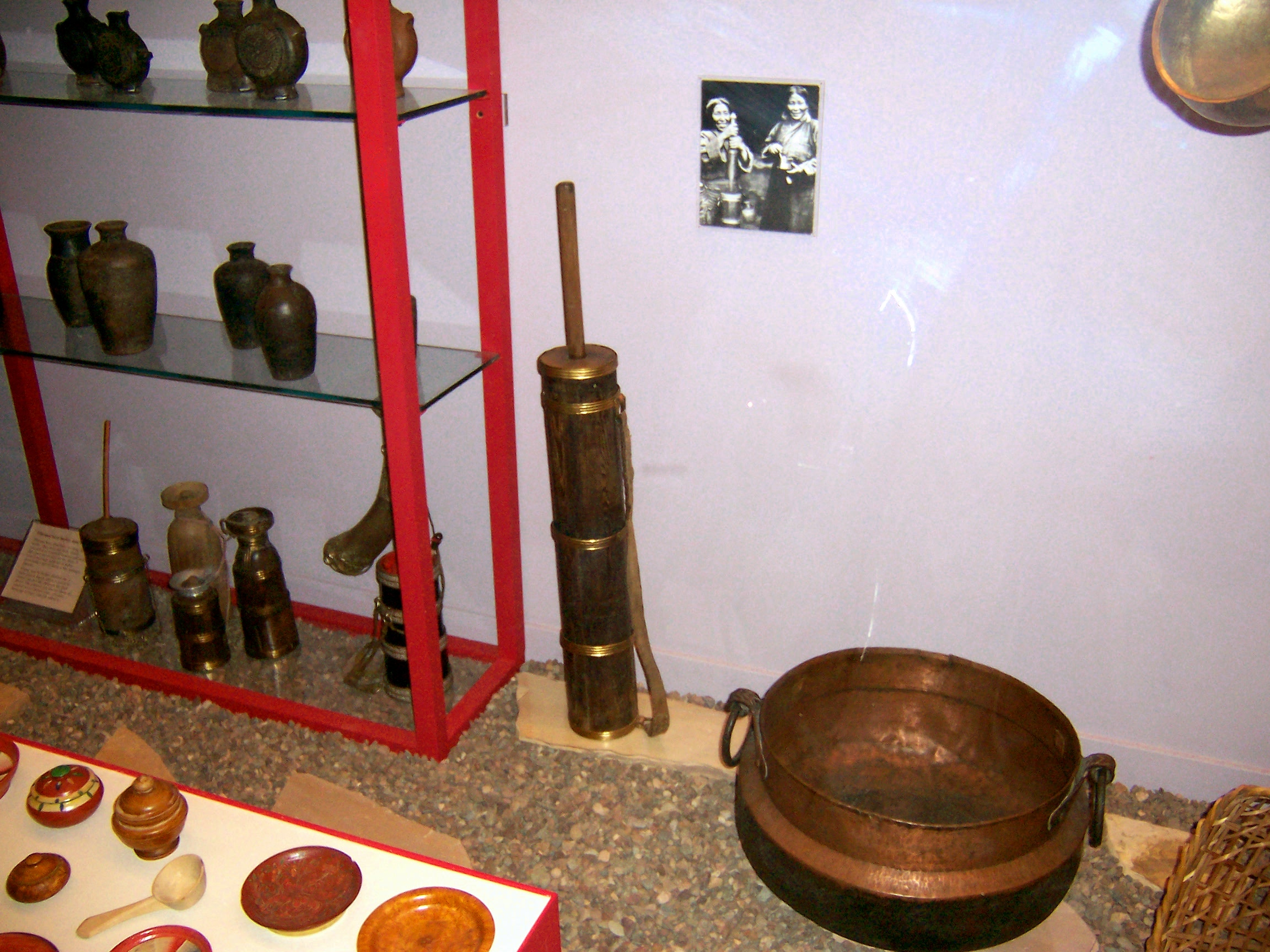
Butter churn, displayed with Tibetan kitchen items at the Field Museum. Note the strap for carrying it and its small size, adaptations to nomadic use.

Yaks provide their herders with many different benefits, including dung for fuel, draught power, meat, fiber, and milk. Not all herding communities have a tradition of using yak milk or making butter, although in regions of mountain pastures the practice is common. Each individual yak cow produces little milk, so only when large herds are present can herders expect much milk to be obtained. Milk is much more plentiful in summer than winter; turning fresh milk into butter or cheese is a way to store calories for later use.

In western Tibet, yak's milk is first allowed to ferment overnight. In summer, the resulting yogurt-like substance is churned for about an hour by plunging a wooden paddle repeatedly into a tall wooden churn. In winter, yogurt is accumulated for several days, then poured into an inflated sheep's stomach and shaken until butter forms.

Fresh yak butter is preserved a number of ways, and can last for up to a year when unexposed to air and stored in cool dry conditions. It is sewn into sheep-stomach bags, wrapped in yak skin, or wrapped in big rhododendron leaves. Once the container is opened, yak butter will begin to decompose; producing veins of blue mold similar to blue cheese.

The English word "yak" is a loan originating from Tibetan: གཡག་, Wylie: g.yak. In Tibetan, it refers only to the male of the species, who needless to say does not produce milk (a literal translation into Tibetan would be like saying "bull butter"); the females are called Tibetan: འབྲི་, Wylie: 'bri, or nak. In English, as in most other languages that have borrowed the word, "yak" is usually used for both sexes.

== Uses ==
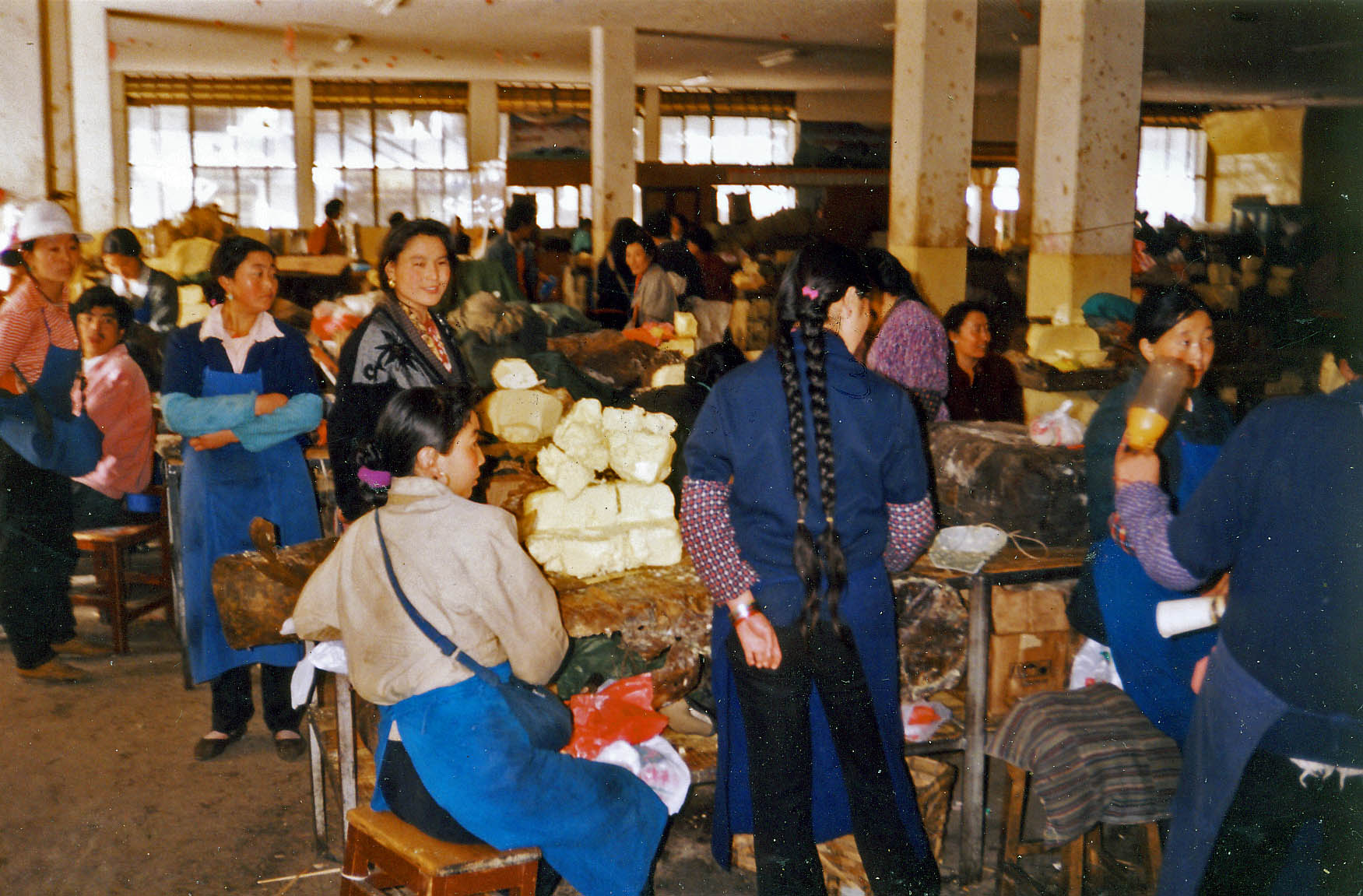
Yak butter market in the Tromzikhang, Lhasa (1993).

Yak butter tea is a daily staple dish throughout the Himalaya region and is usually made with yak butter, tea, salt and water churned into a froth. It is the Tibetan national beverage, with Tibetans drinking upwards of sixty small cups a day for hydration and nutrition needed in cold high altitudes. Sometimes rancid butter is used, which gives the tea a different taste.

Melted yak butter may be mixed, in roughly equal proportions, with roasted barley flour (tsampa). The resulting dough, mixed with dates or sesame seeds, is used for welcoming guests. It can also be stored for later use and then melted into hot water, to which salt or sugar has been added.

Yak butter is used in traditional tanning of hides. Old, rancid butter is preferred over fresh.

Other non-food uses include fueling yak-butter lamps, moisturizing skin, and the traditional butter sculptures for Tibetan New Year. Such yak-butter sculptures may reach nearly 10 meters in height.

In Nepal, particularly in Kathmandu, yak cheese and yak butter are produced in factories and sold commercially. During 1997–1998, twenty-six tonnes of butter were produced and sold this way in Nepal.

== See also ==
- List of spreads
- List of Tibetan dishes
