= Cheese soup =

Type of soup

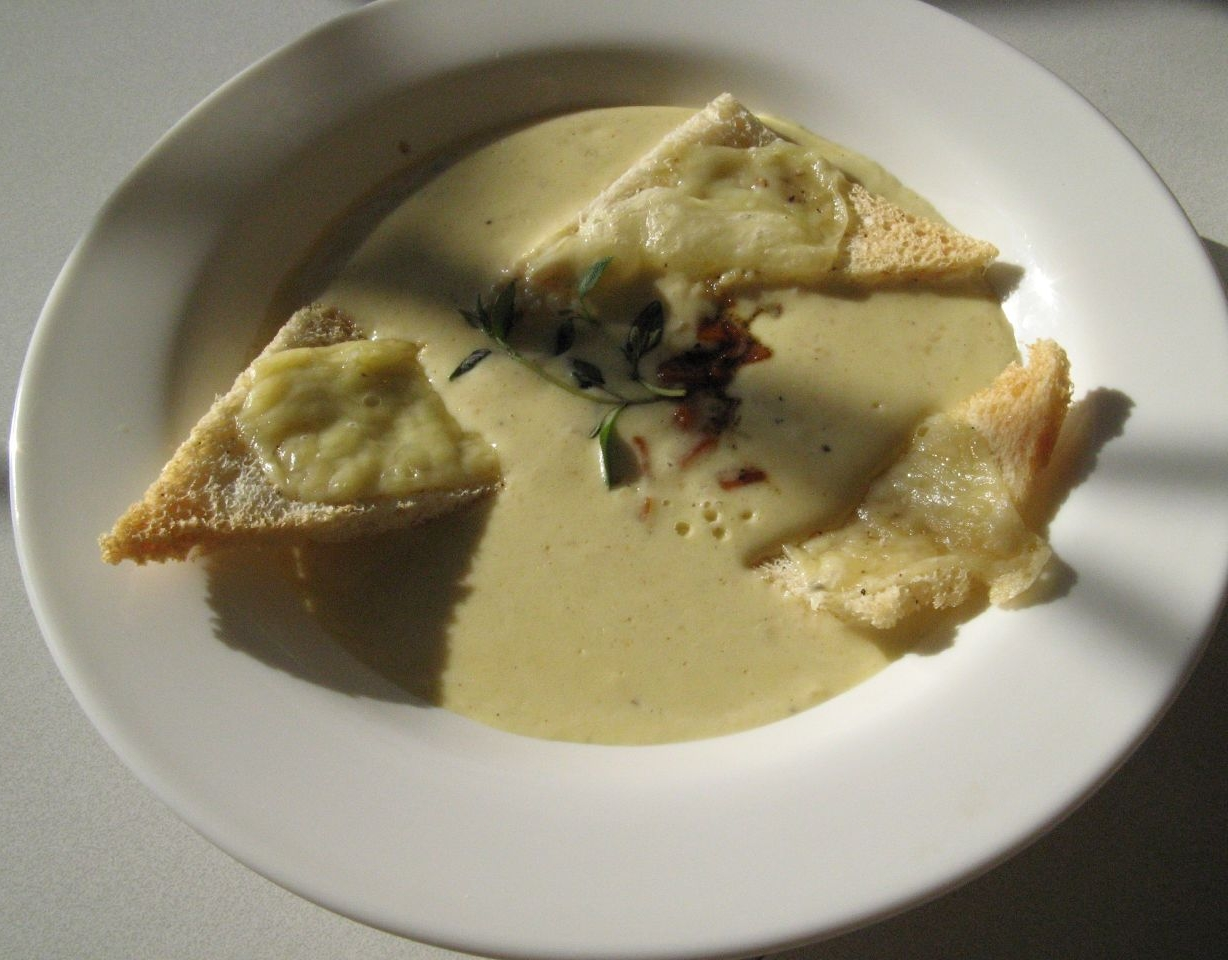
Four-cheese soup at a restaurant

Cheese soup is a type of soup prepared using cheese as a primary ingredient, along with milk, broth and/or stock to form its basis. Various additional ingredients are used in its preparation, and various types and styles of cheese soup exist. It is a part of some cuisines in the world, such as American, Colombian, Mexican, Swiss, French, and Tibetan cuisines. Mass-produced cheese soups may be prepared with the addition of food additives to preserve them and enhance flavor. A list of cheese soups is included in this article.

== Overview ==
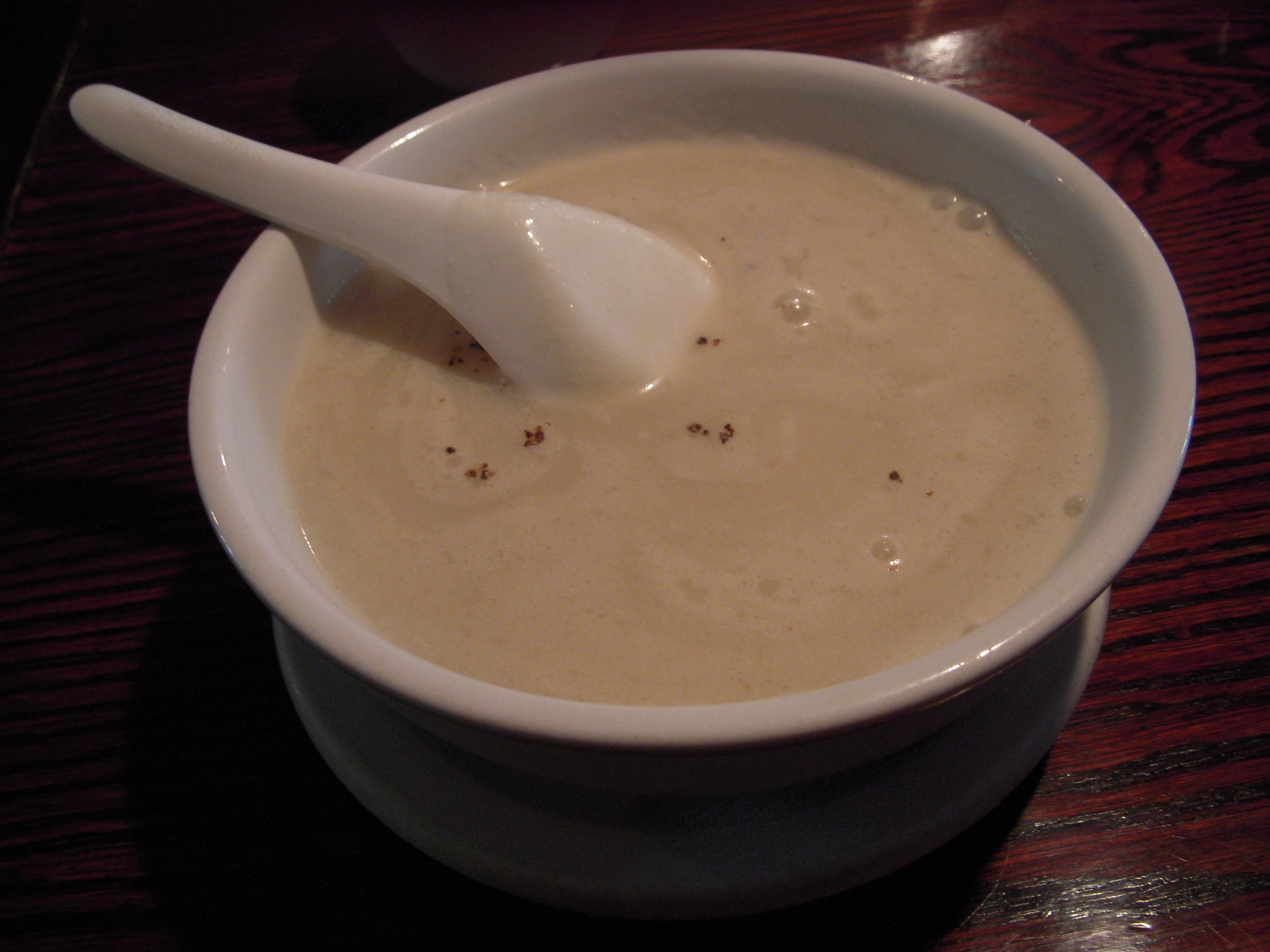
Churu at a restaurant, prepared using blue cheese

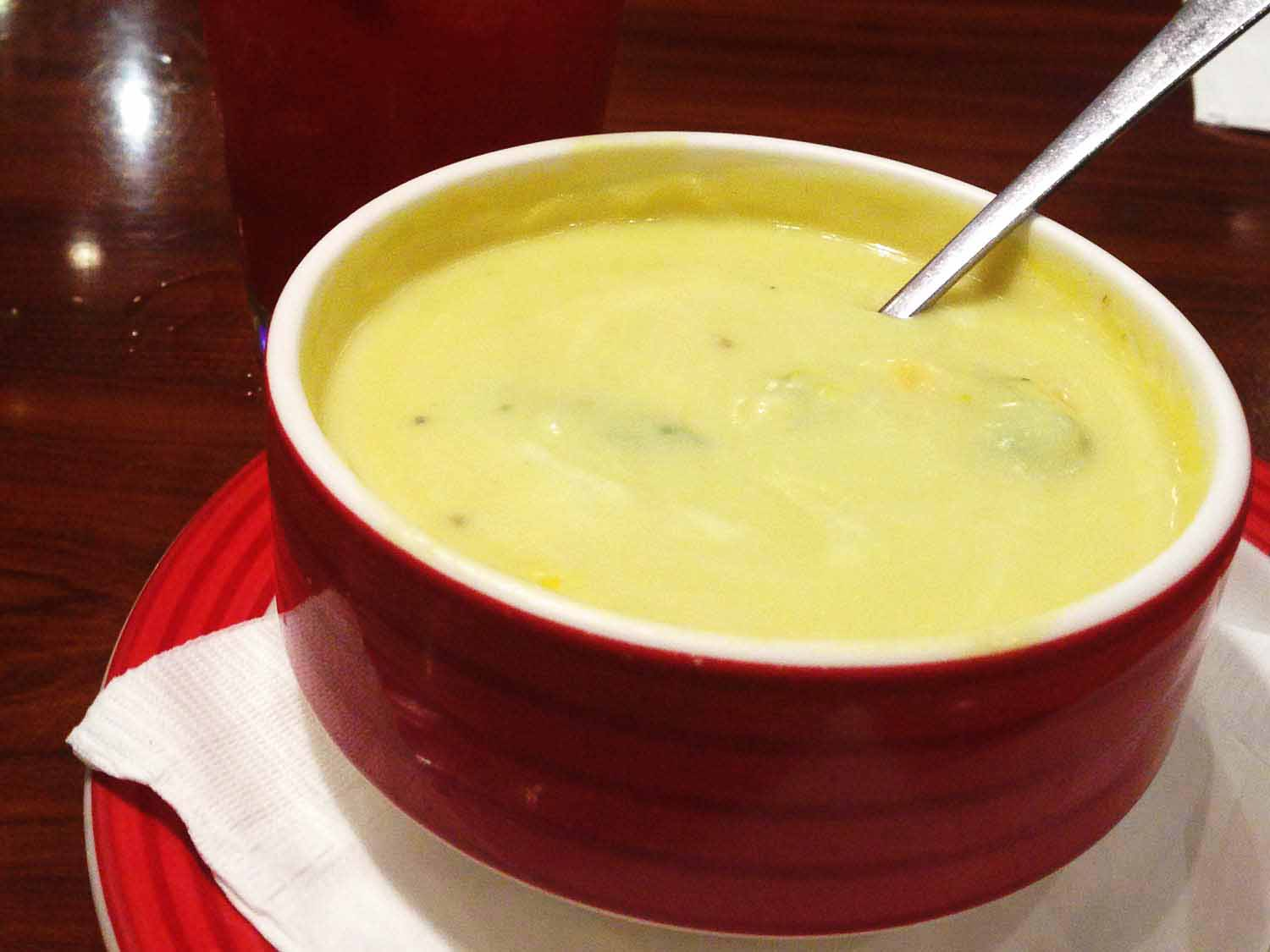
Broccoli cheese soup

Cheese soup is a part of various cuisines, such as American cuisine, Colombian cuisine, French cuisine, Mexican cuisine, Swiss cuisine and Tibetan cuisine. Mote de queso is a traditional cheese soup dish in the Córdoba Department of Colombia. In Spanish, 'cheese soup' translates to sopa de queso, and a published Mexican recipe from 1893 exists for the dish under this name. In Switzerland, cheese soup is referred to as Kassuppe, and it is a specialty dish in Central Switzerland. Churu is a Tibetan cheese soup prepared with churu cheese of Tibet.

=== Ingredients ===
Cheese is a main ingredient in cheese soup, and is typically used in the dish in grated form or in chunks or pieces. Cheeses used include hard cheeses like Cheddar, Gruyère and Parmesan cheese and soft ones such as farmer cheese, Gouda cheese, muenster cheese, queso blanco and queso Chihuahua. The cheese adds both flavor and nutritional value to the soup. Processed cheese (including Velveeta), such as pasteurized process cheese and pasteurized process cheese food is sometimes used instead of natural cheese. Some cheese soups have a rich flavor and may be high in fat due to the use of high-fat ingredients such as butter and heavy cream, in addition to the fat in the cheese. Fat content of the soup can be reduced by the use of ingredients such as low- or non-fat cheese, fat-free milk and fat-free stock.

Milk and/or broth such as chicken broth or stock are used to form the liquid basis for cheese soup. Additional ingredients can include half and half, beer, bread crumbs, butter, eggs, onion, onion juice, garlic, vegetables such as broccoli, cauliflower, carrot and celery, spices and seasonings. Ingredients that can enhance the flavor of cheese soup include chopped bacon, beer and chopped broccoli, among various others. Croutons are sometimes used as topping.

=== Preparation ===
Cheese soup is sometimes cooked in a bain-marie (double boiler) to prevent it from burning or scorching, which can occur when it is cooked over the direct heat on a stove burner. Cheese soups can also be reheated using a double boiler.

=== Mass-produced ===
Mass-produced cheese soups may have additives to enhance their flavor and to preserve them. For example, modified-butterfat products are used in some mass-produced cheese soups as a flavor enhancer. Gels formed from pectin are used in some mass-produced cheese soups as a fat replacement.

== List of cheese soups ==
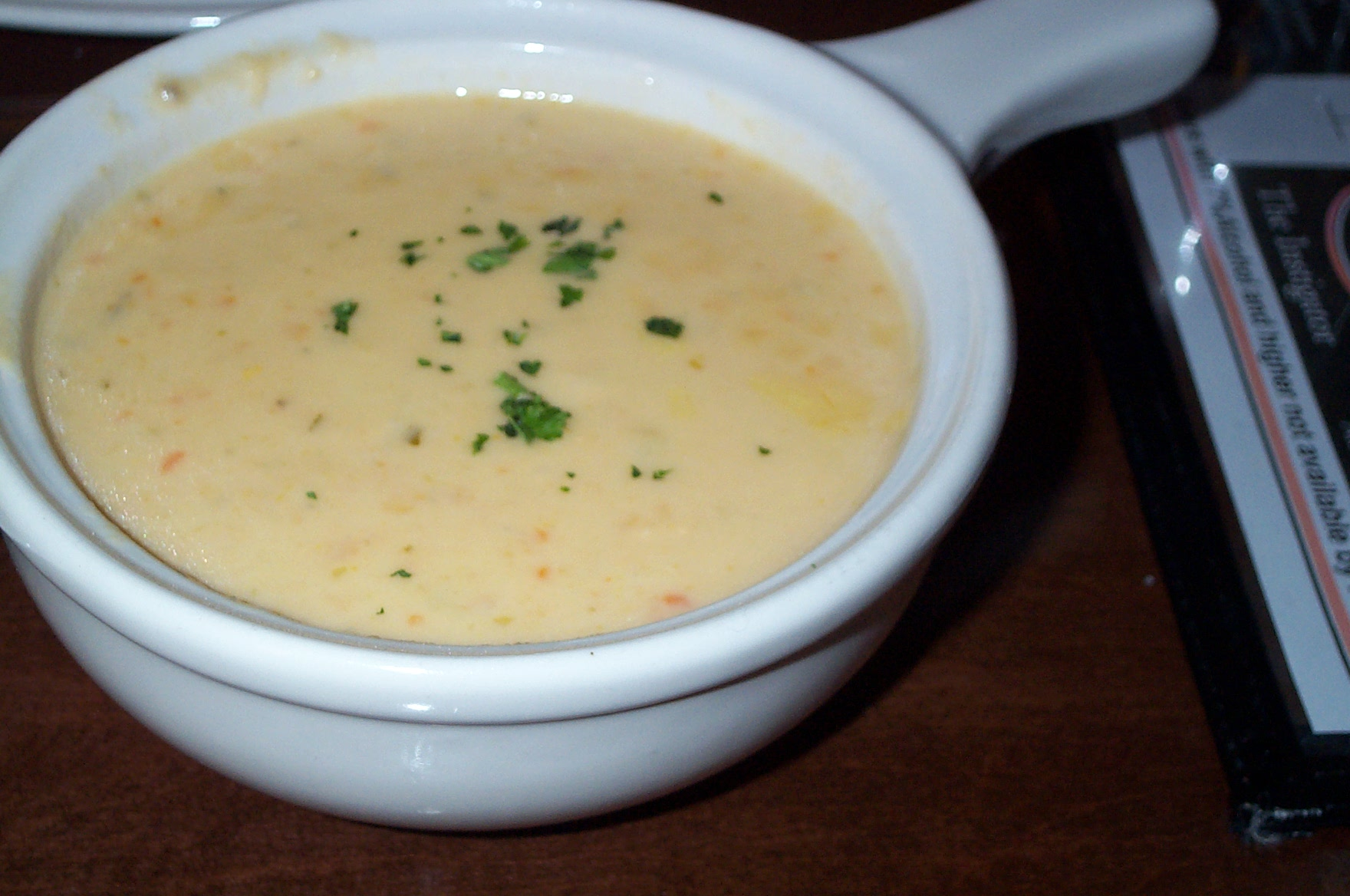
Beer cheese soup

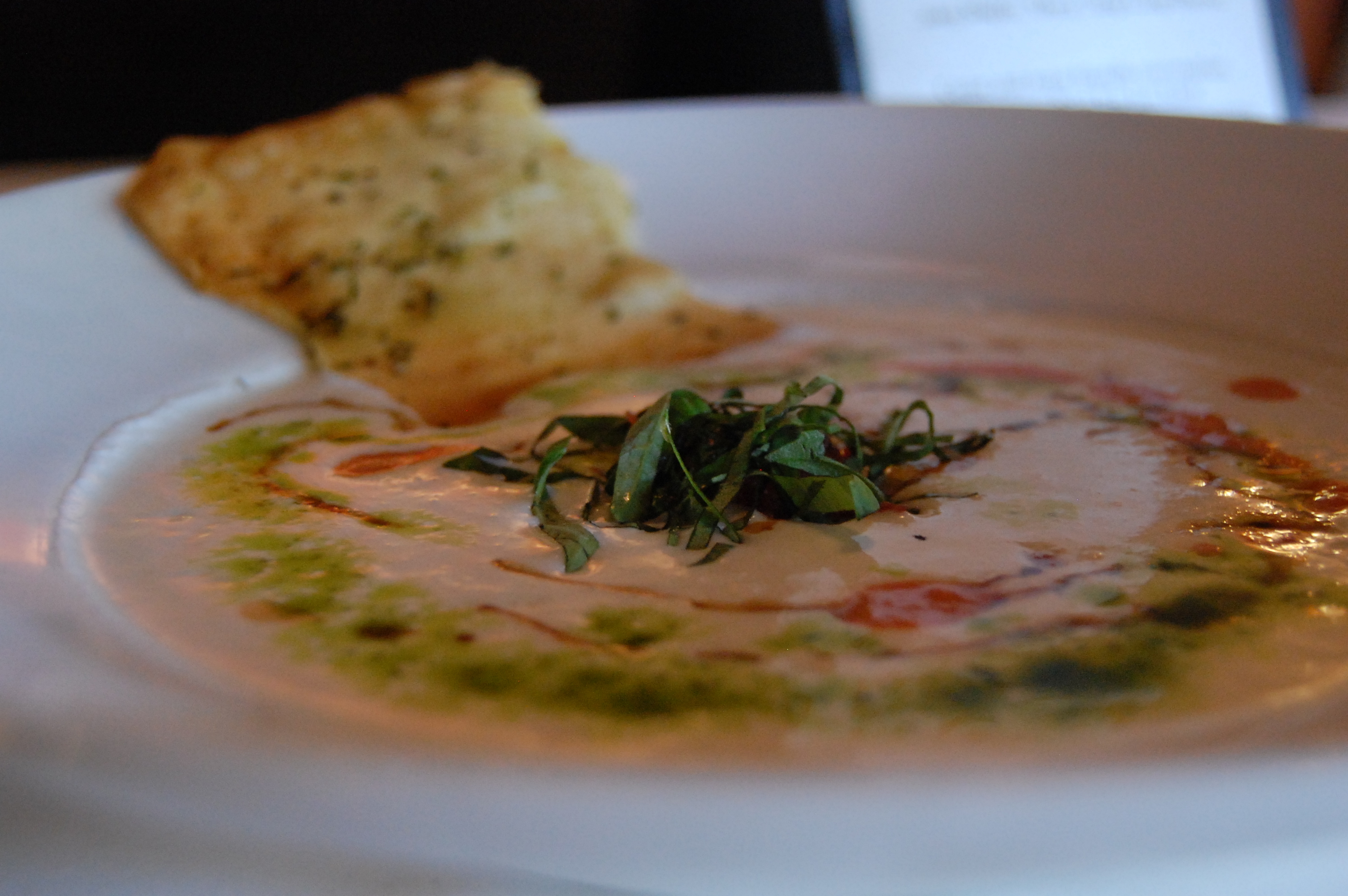
Mozzarella soup

- Beer cheese soup
- Blue cheese soup – soup in Irish cuisine and other cuisines
- Broccoli cheese soup
- Caldo de queso – Sonoran cheese soup
- Cauliflower cheese soup
- Cheddar soup – mass-produced, condensed versions of this soup are manufactured by some companies. It can also be prepared fresh, from scratch. Cooked broccoli is a frequent addition to this soup.
- Cheeseburger soup
- Churu – Tibetan cheese soup prepared with Tibetan mold-ripened churu cheese. Both the cheese and the soup are referred to using the name churu. Churu soup may also include lamb as an ingredient. Blue cheese is sometimes used instead of churu cheese.
- Cottage cheese soup
- Cream cheese soup
- Cream of cheese soup
- Mote de queso – Colombian cheese soup chowder prepared with yam and cheese as primary ingredients. Farmer's cheese is sometimes used as the cheese ingredient. It is a traditional dish in the Córdoba Department of Colombia. Some Cordovans refer to the soup as a delicacy and as a traditional soup passed on from their ancestors, and many Cordovans consider the dish to be historically significant.
- Mozzarella soup
- Nacho cheese soup
- Parmesan cheese soup
- Soupe au fromage – a traditional and peasant food from the south of Massif central
Cheese soups

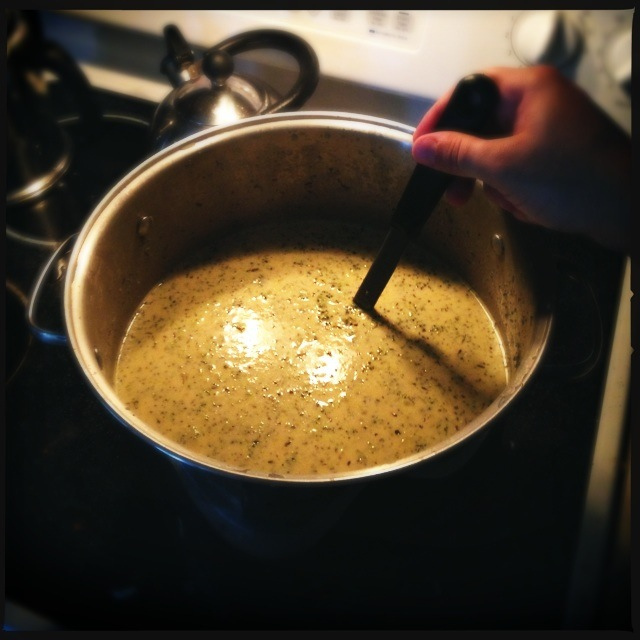
Homemade broccoli cheese soup

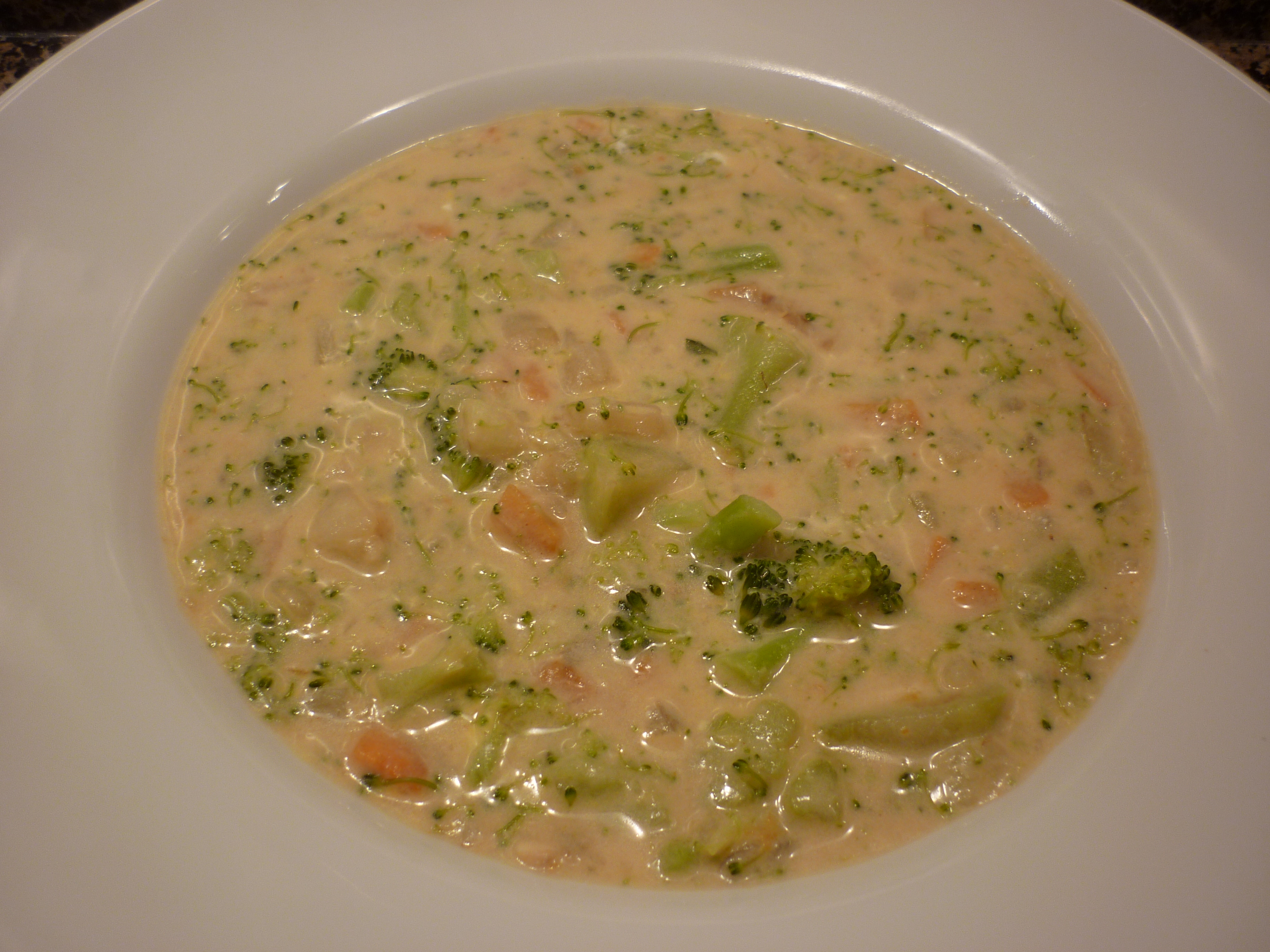
Broccoli cheese chowder

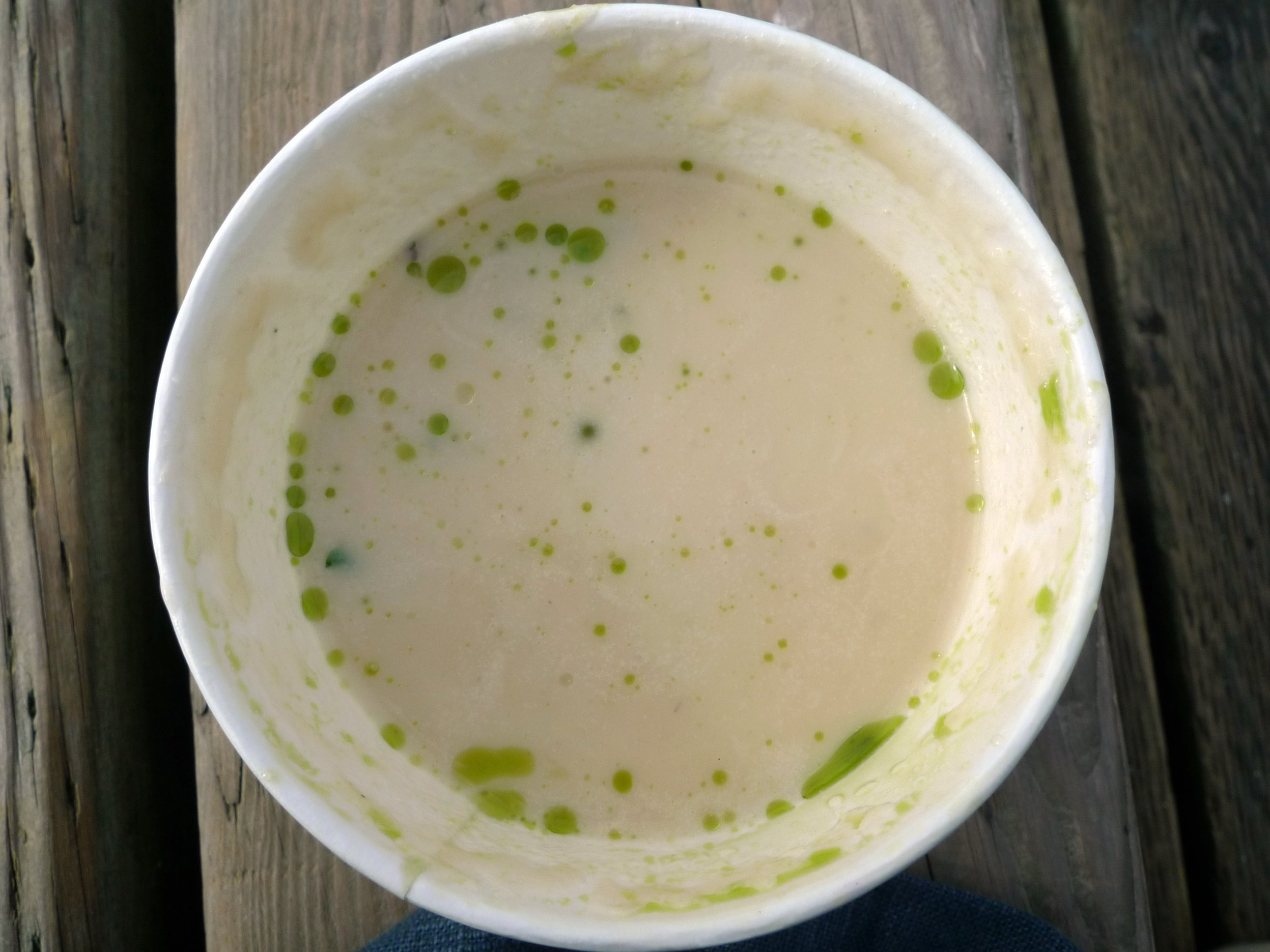
Cauliflower cheese soup prepared with blue cheese, topped with olive oil

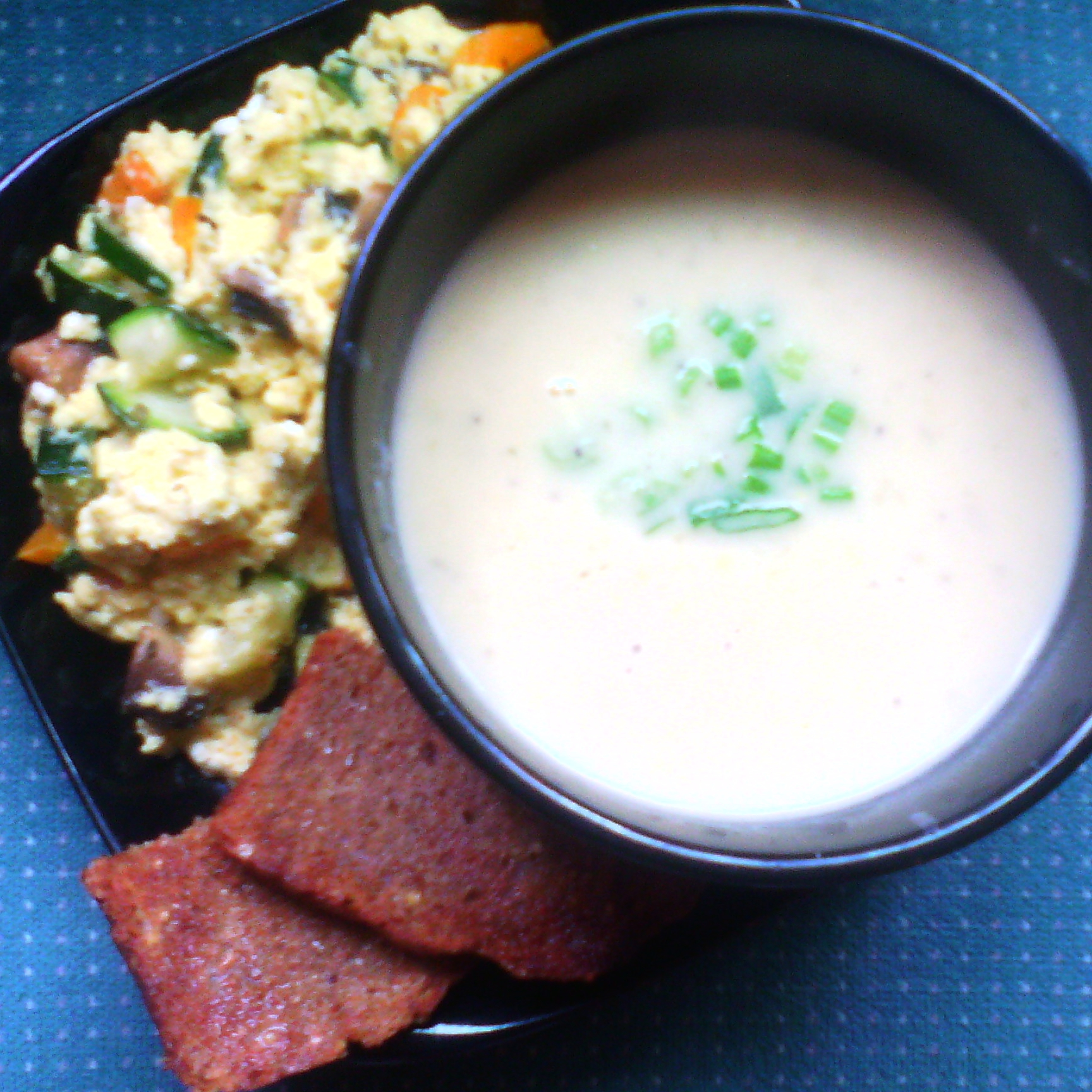
Cheddar soup prepared with white cheddar

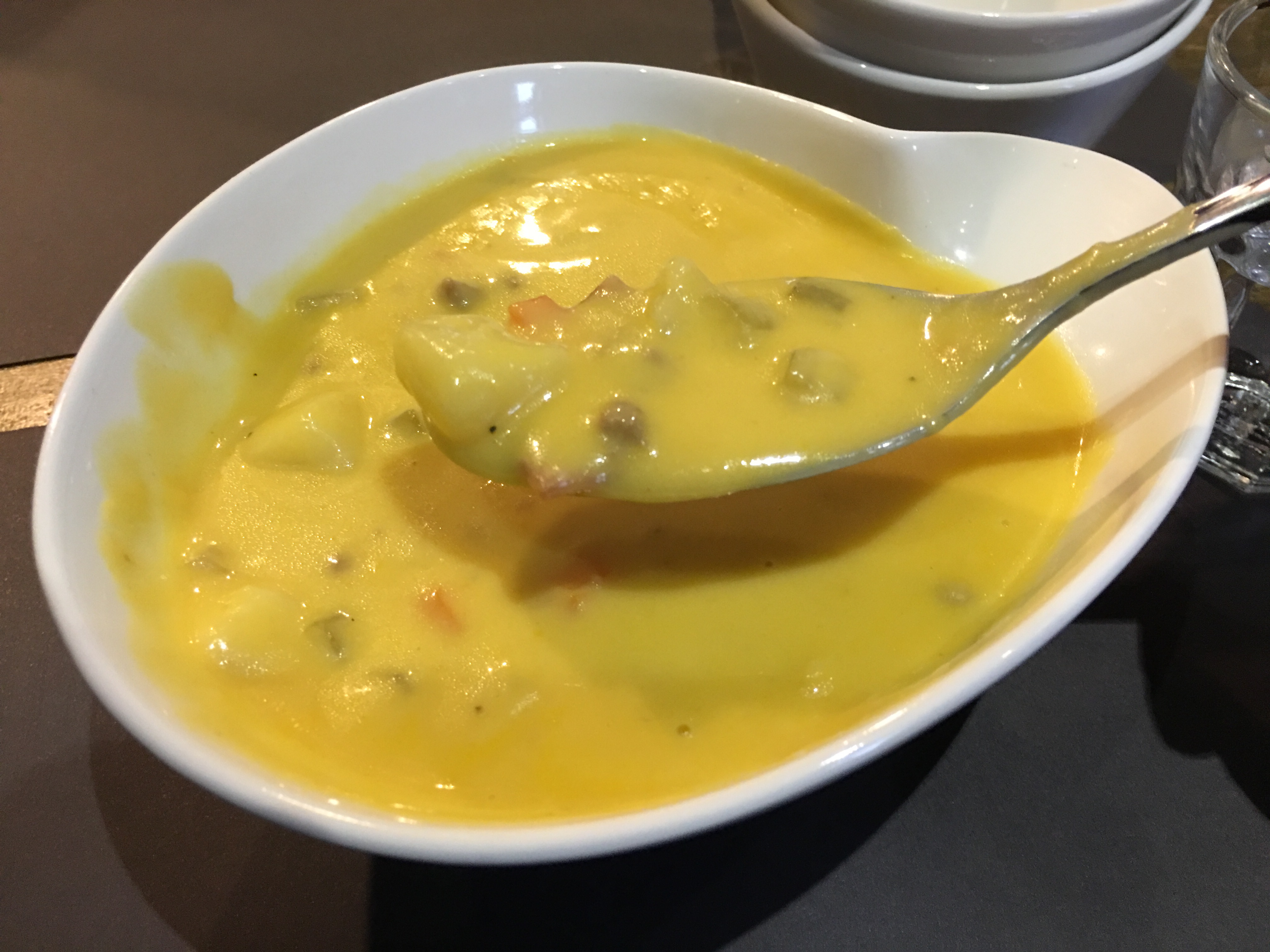
Cheeseburger soup at a restaurant

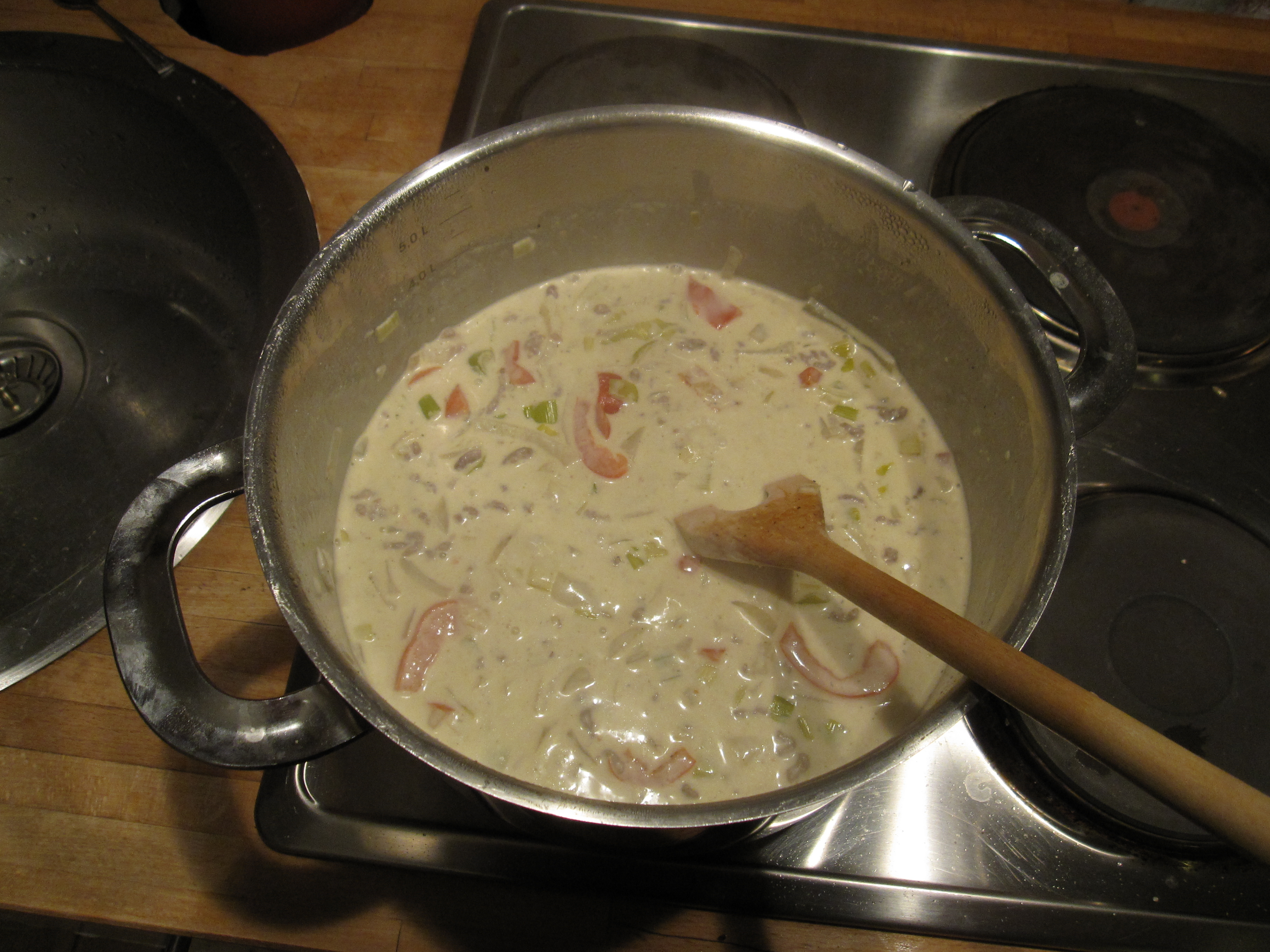
Cream cheese soup

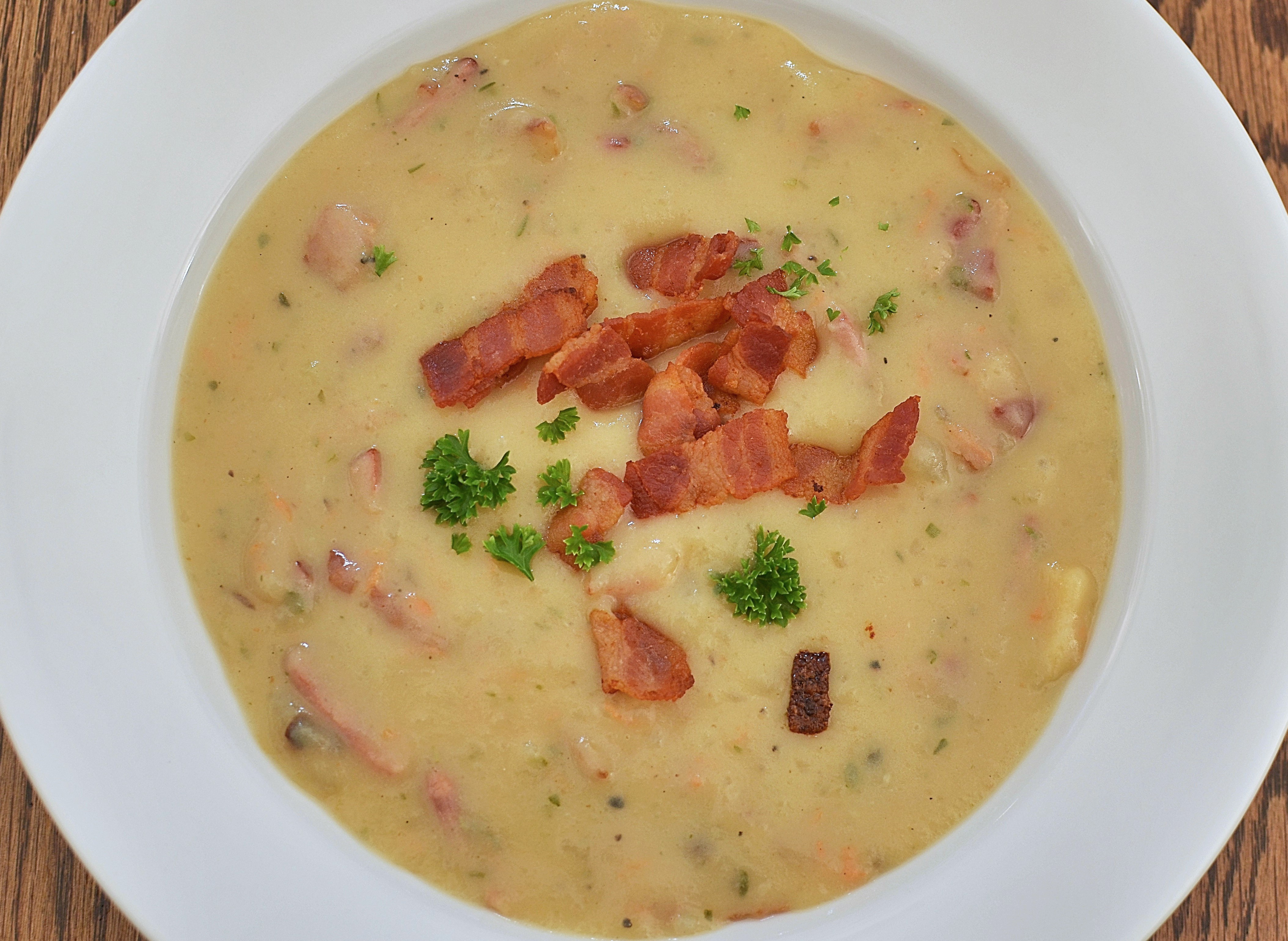
Parmesan potato soup topped with bacon

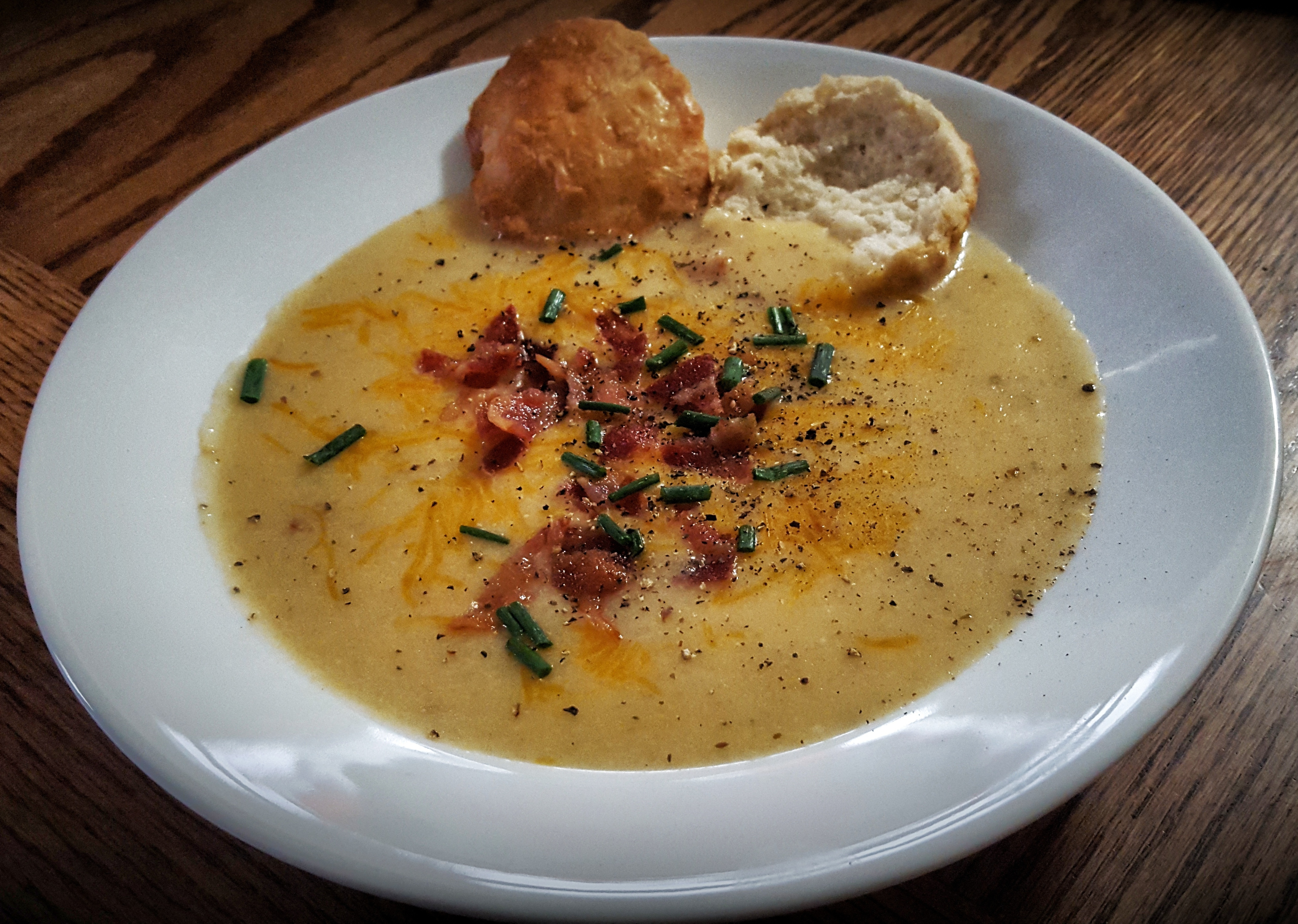
Potato cheese soup

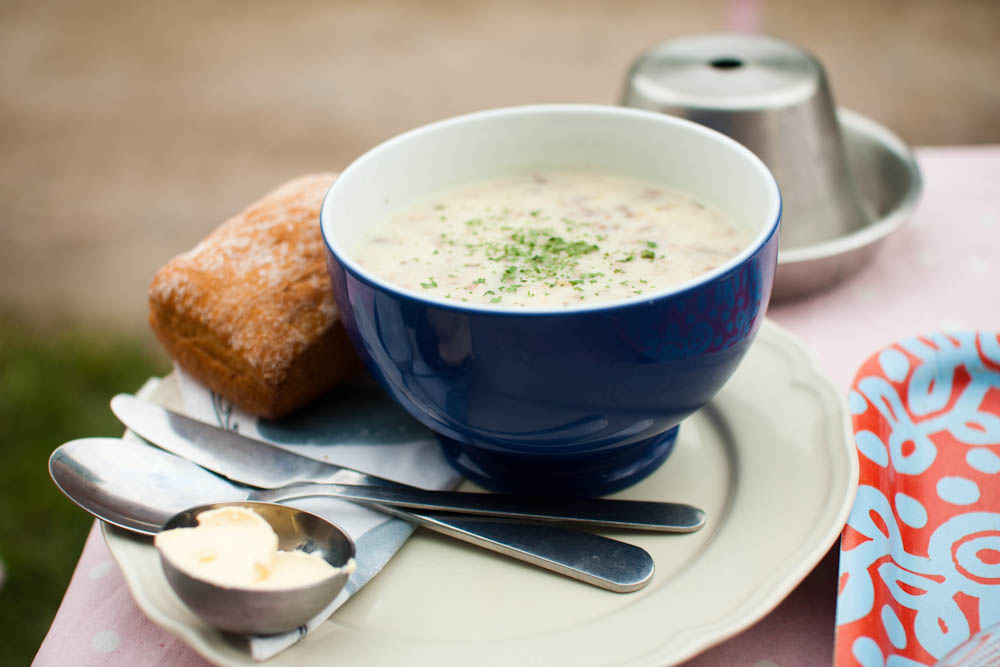
A cheese soup prepared with reindeer cheese

== See also ==
- Chile con queso – a dip of melted cheese and chili peppers
- Fondue
- French onion soup – often served with melted cheese atop it
- Fried cheese
- List of cheese dishes
- List of soups
- Queso flameado – a hot melted cheese and chorizo dish

== Bibliography ==
- Jinich, P. (2016). Mexican Today: New and Rediscovered Recipes for Contemporary Kitchens. Houghton Mifflin Harcourt. ISBN 978-0-544-55725-3.
