= Nyi Shu Gu =

Nyi Shu Gu is the eve before the last day of the Tibetan year (29th). It is celebrated with various traditions leading up to the Tibetan New Year: Losar. Guthuk is a common Tibetan cuisine noodle soup that is associated with Nyi Shu Gu. Thukpa bhatuk is the common style of noodle soup that becomes Guthuk when eaten with special ingredients and elements on Nyi Shu Gu. Nyi Shu Gu is a time to cleanse and bid adieu to negativities, obstacles, uncleanliness and sickness. A fire is traditional as is washing up.
