= Churu =

Churu may refer to

- Churu, Rajasthan, a city in India
  - Churu district, the Indian district containing the city
  - Churu (Lok Sabha constituency), an Indian constituciency
  - Churu (Rajasthan Assembly constituency), part of the above
- Churu (Bolivia), a mountain in Bolivia
  - Churu Pata, another mountain in Bolivia near the Churu
- Churu, Iran, a village in Iran
- Churu (Zimbabwe constituency)
- Churu (cheese), a Tibetan cheese
  - Churu (soup), a soup made with this cheese
- Churu people, an ethnic group in Vietnam
- Churu language, or Chru, a language of Vietnam

== See also ==
- Chru (disambiguation)
- Churul (disambiguation)
- Churup
