= Tsam-thuk =

Tibetan soup

Tsam-thuk is a type of Tibetan cuisine soup that uses yak or sheep soup stock and tsampa (roasted barley flour) as well as a variety of Tibetan cheeses. It can be served at room temperature.

== See also ==
- List of soups
- List of Tibetan dishes
