= Churul =

Churul may refer to:

- Churul (cheese), a type of cheese in Tibetan cuisine
- Offering of Churul, a ritual of the Ayyavazhi religion of India

== See also ==
- Churu (disambiguation)
- Churuli, a 2021 Indian film by Lijo Jose Pellisery
