= Reindeer cheese =

Cheese made of the milk of reindeers

Cheese made from the milk of the reindeer has been historically found in Scandinavia. Modern Finnish cheeses like leipäjuusto were also made with reindeer milk in the past.

Reindeer milk is among the richest and most nutritious of milks, at 22% butterfat and 10% protein; however a reindeer can be milked only for about 1.5 cups per day.

== Historical description ==
Per the 1913 Pure Products:

Reindeer cheese, of which we present two illustrations taken from a paper by Barthel and Bergman may be called the richest of all whole milk cheeses, as nearly half its weight consists of butter fats. It is, in fact, a rich cream cheese. It is yellow on the outside and white on the interior, except in the neighborhood of the numerous cracks, where it is also yellow. When cut into, the white rapidly changes to a golden yellow. The taste is very mild, very creamy, and the cheese melts very easily in the mouth, with the fine aroma of the reindeer milk; it easily becomes rancid and then acquires a strong odor and a burning taste.

The Sami [sic] frequently take their cheese with coffee in place of cream.

== Gallery ==
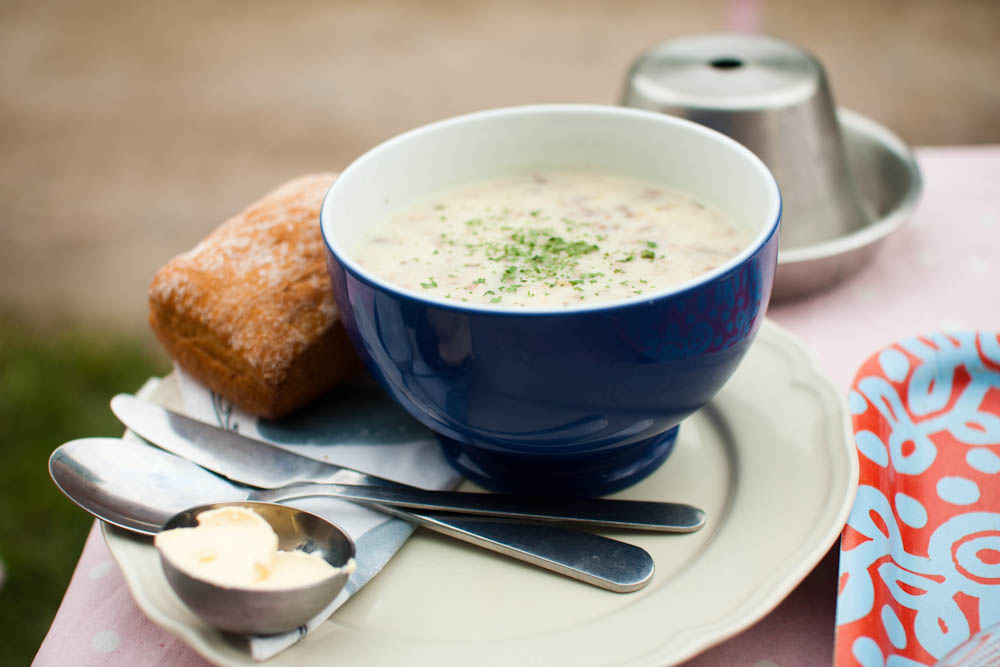
A cheese soup prepared with reindeer cheese
