= Chru =

Chru may refer to

- Chru people, an ethnic group in Vietnam
- Chru language, their language

== See also ==
- Churu (disambiguation)
