= Thukpa bhatuk =

Tibetan noodle soup

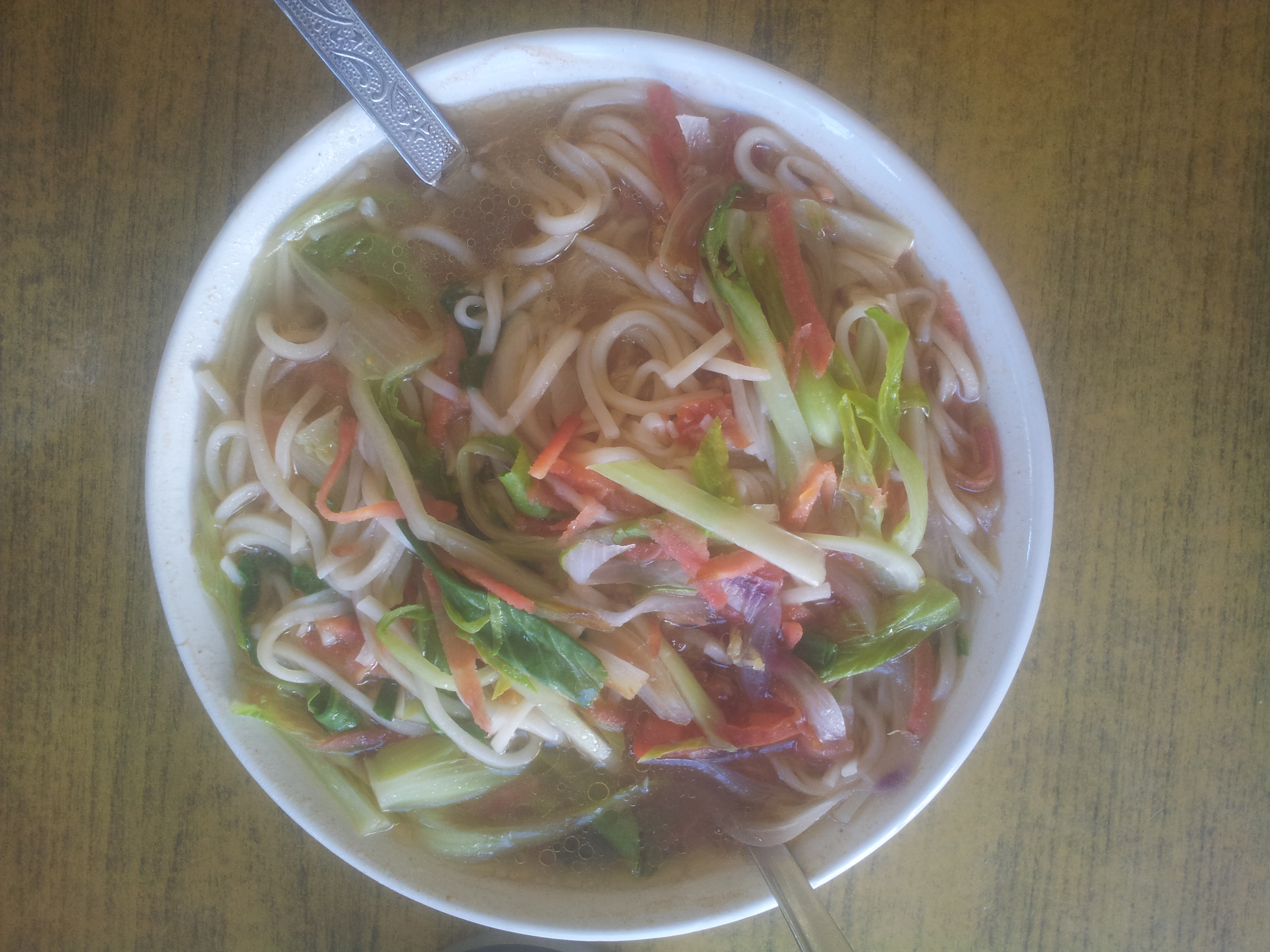
- Thukpa bhatuk
- Type: Noodle Soup
- Place of origin: Amdo, Tibet
- Region or state: Tibet, Nepal, Qinghai, Sichuan
- Associated cuisine: Tibetan cuisine
- Main ingredients: Vegetables

Thukpa bhatuk is a common Tibetan cuisine noodle soup that includes small bhatsa noodles. This dish is a common soup made in the winter but is especially important for Tibetan New Year. On Nyi-Shu-Gu, the eve of Losar (Tibetan New Year), the common Tibetan soup, thukpa bhatuk is made with special ingredients to form guthuk. Guthuk is then eaten on Losar to symbolise getting rid of negativities of the past year and invite positives into the new year.

== Soup ==
In the thukpa bhatuk soup, the main components are the handmade bhatsa noodles, which are similar to the Italian gnocchi. Some bhatsa noodles used for this soup are called gutsi rithuk and another noodle type is called bhatuk. Both of these noodles are referred to as bhatuk in Central Tibet.

Meat is usually a main ingredient in this soup, commonly mutton, beef or yak; however, this soup can also be made vegetarian with a vegetable bouillon.

== Customs ==
=== Guthuk ===
At the time of Tibetan New Year the common soup, thukpa bhatuk is transformed into guthuk. Guthuk is only eaten at this time of the year on the eve of Losar, Tibetan New Year. This dish is part of the ritual to dispel any negativities of the old year to make way for a better, positive new year.

There are three main differences between thukpa bhatuk and guthuk:

1. Thukpa bhatuk is a common soup while guthuk is only eaten on Nyi-Shu-Gu (Tibetan New Year's Eve)
2. Guthuk specifically has nine main ingredients. For example, a traditional guthuk would include meat (mutton, beef, or yak) and dried cheese. A vegetarian guthuk would include mushrooms, celery, labu (radish), peas, tomato, onion, ginger, garlic, and spinach.
3. To satisfy rituals with the guthuk, each person gets a large dough ball with a symbol inside revealing a trait of the person who gets it.

Traditional guthuk

Thukpa barthuk noodle soup with yak and dried cheese and oracle dough-ball of one's choice

Vegetarian guthuk

Thukpa bhatuk noodle soup with mushrooms, labu (radish) and peas and oracle dough-ball

=== Losar: Tibetan New Year ===
Losar is made up of lo ('year') and sar ('new'); it is the Tibetan New Year and is celebrated both in Tibet and Nepal. Losar begins on the first day of the first month of the Tibetan calendar and Nepali calendar and is celebrated on a different day each year. On the eve of Losar, which is called Nyi-Shu-Gu, the old year is expelled along with all its negativities. It is custom for homes and bodies to be purified and cleaned to invite positives for the New Year. The New Year is then brought in with specific ceremonial rituals including the specially made thukpa batuk called guthuk. This soup is made on Nyi-Shu-Gu and is specific to the celebration of Losar.

=== Nyi-Shu-Gu ===
As explained, Nyi-Shu-Gu is the Tibetan New Year's Eve, which is the 29th day of the last month of the year, according to the Tibetan calendar and Nepali calendar. Nyi-Shu-Gu is a day to dismiss negativities from homes and bodies and to make the guthuk soup. A traditional custom in Central Tibet is to heat water over a fire for everyone to bathe and wash their hair. Normally, people do not bathe everyday, but everyone takes care to be thoroughly clean in preparation for Losar. Once everything is purified, the guthuk soup is eaten and the negativities are expelled.

== See also ==
- List of soups
- List of Tibetan dishes
- Tibetan cuisine
- Losar
- Guthuk
- Nyi-Shu-Gu
- Tibetan calendar
