= Chura kampo =

Tibetan cheese

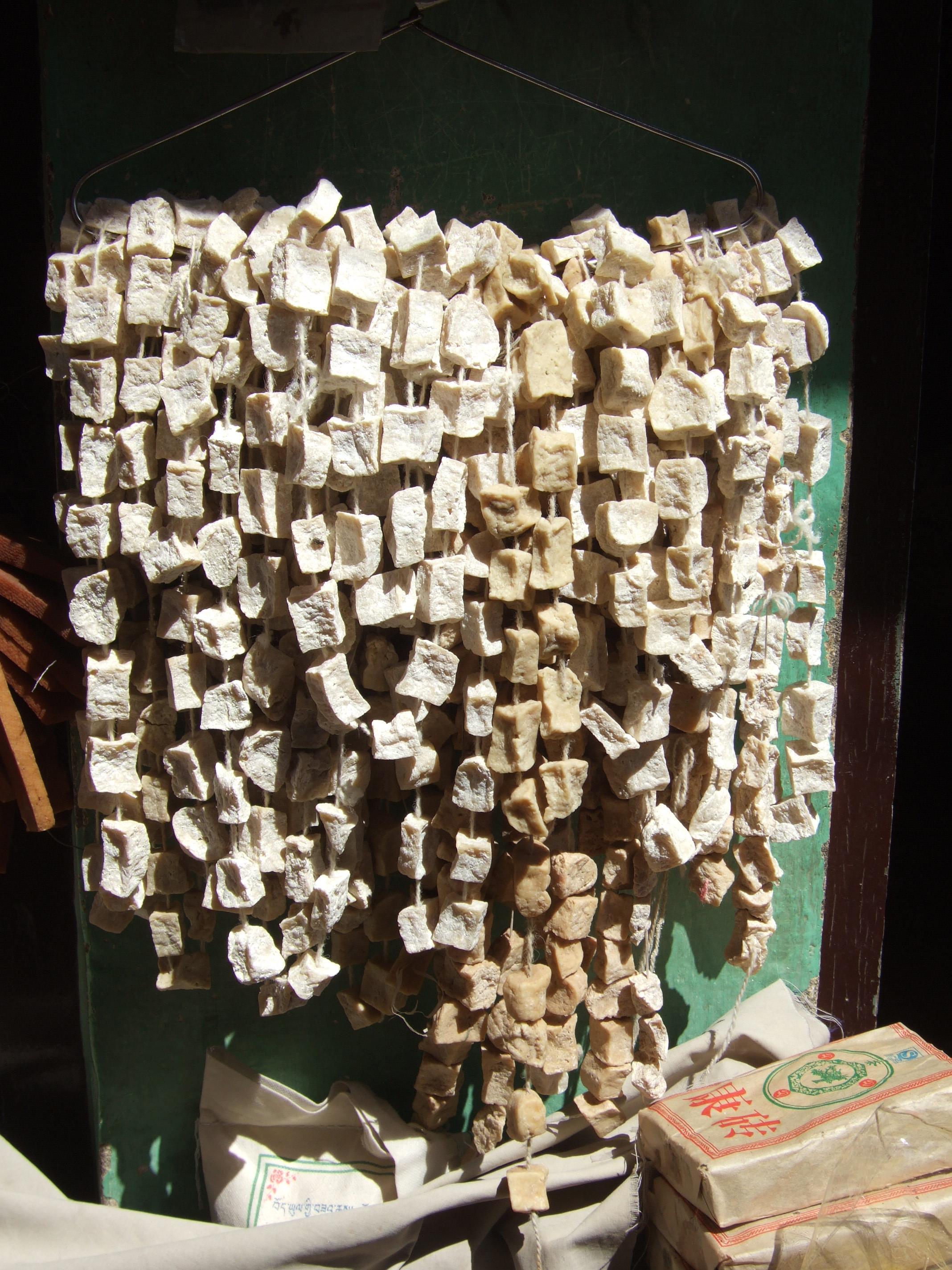
Pieces of chura kampo hanging upon rope to dry

Chura kampo (Tibetan dried cheese) is a Tibetan cheese and important within the cuisine of Tibet. Chura kampo is made from the curds left over from boiling buttermilk. There are many possible shapes for chura kampo. Small pieces of Chura kampo are eaten similarly to how candy bars are eaten in Western countries. This cheese is composed of little chunks of dried hard cheese that last long when it is chewed.

== See also ==
- Chura loenpa (soft Tibetan cheese)
- List of cheeses
- List of Tibetan dishes
- Tibetan culture
