= Chura loenpa =

Tibetan cheese

Chura loenpa is a Tibetan cheese important within the cuisine of Tibet. It is a soft cheese, similar to cottage cheese, made from the curds that are left over from boiling buttermilk.

== See also ==
- Chura kampo (dried Tibetan cheese)
- List of cheeses
- List of Tibetan dishes
- Tibetan culture
