= Soupe au fromage =

Cheese soup in south-central France

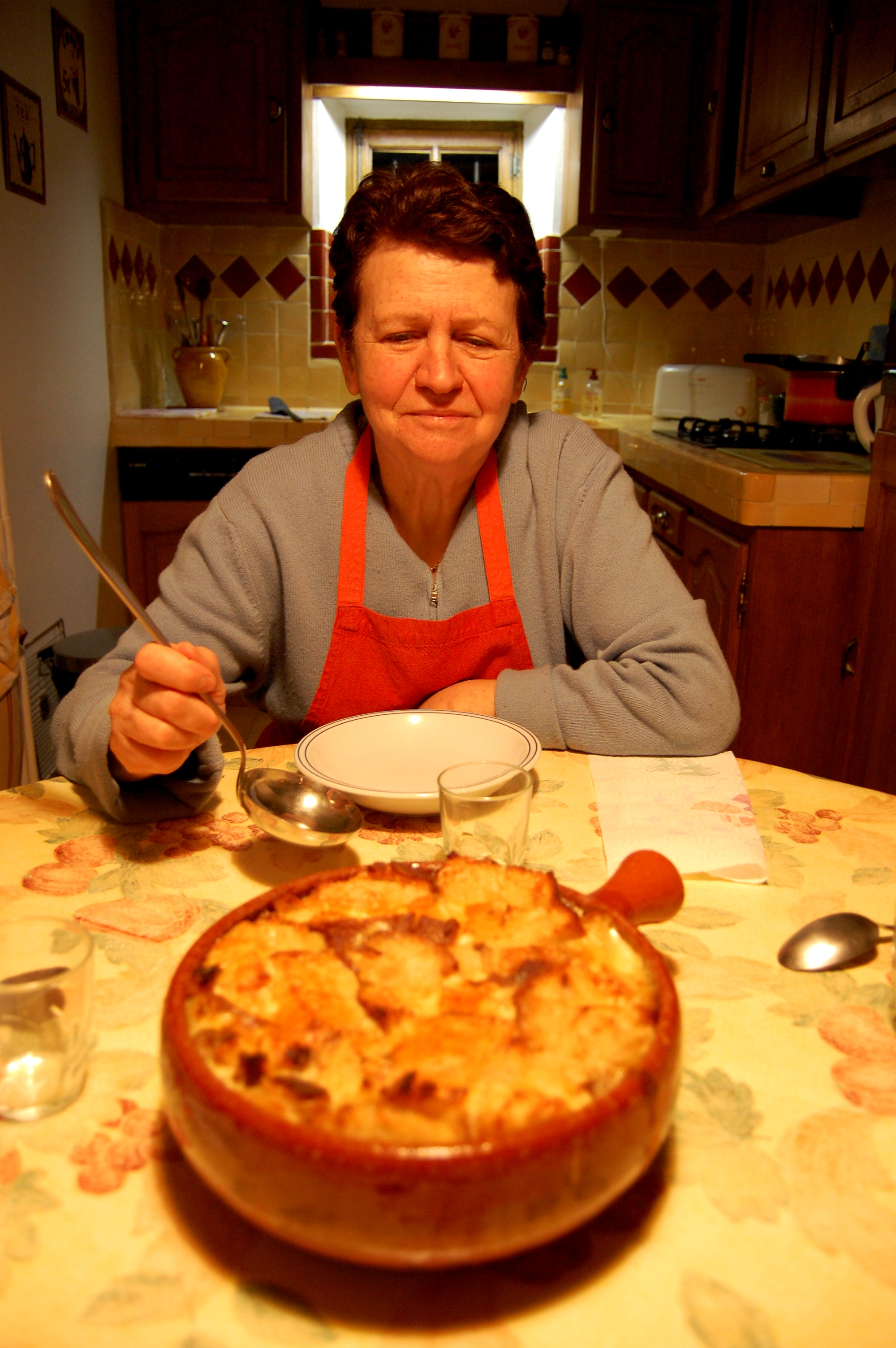
- Gratinated cheese soup made from laguiole cheese, ready to be consumed
- Alternative names: Day-after-the-party soup
- Type: Casserole
- Course: Main meal
- Place of origin: France
- Region or state: Massif Central (Aubrac, Auvergne, Rouergue)
- Associated cuisine: French cuisine
- Serving temperature: Hot
- Main ingredients: Onions, cabbage, shredded cheese (laguiole or cantal), garlic, broth, dry white wine, stale bread, salt, pepper
- Other information: Usually served with red wine (Marcillac, Côtes d'Auvergne, Estaing)

Soupe au fromage (cheese soup), also known as day-after-the-party soup, is a peasant dish from the south of France's Massif Central region. Over the last few decades it has become a major feature of local festivities (such as competitions, dances, and votive parties, etc.), and every year a championship is held to distinguish the world's best cheese soup.

The name soupe au fromage makes use of an outdated meaning of "soup", which historically referred to bread soaked in liquid, and cheese soup is in fact a hearty baked dish that is eaten with a fork. Its main ingredients are bread, onions, and cheese. It should not be confused with French onion soup.

== History ==
The dish's original preparation required that the soup simmer all day over an open fire in a large hearth called a "cantou". It was eaten by peasants at the end of the work day, or for breakfast the morning after a party or holiday.

In Rouergue, custom held that cheese soup should be served to the bride and groom on their wedding day. It was delivered to their bedroom in a chamber pot reserved for this purpose, with an eye painted at the bottom of the pot. Today, cheese soup continues to be eaten the day after a party, as a hearty winter dish, or as a late-night snack at weddings.

The commune of Viane has organized a world championship of cheese soup every springtime since 2008.

== Ingredients ==
In general, recipes for la soupe au fromage call for onions, grated cheese, stale bread, dry white wine, butter, flour, broth, salt, and pepper. Garlic cloves, cabbage leaves, or tomatoes are sometimes added.

== Cantal or Laguiole ==
The cheese used to prepare the dish is a subject of controversy, with support divided between laguiole or cantal cheeses. Some modern recipes call for mixing shredded gruyere cheese with either laguiole or cantal.

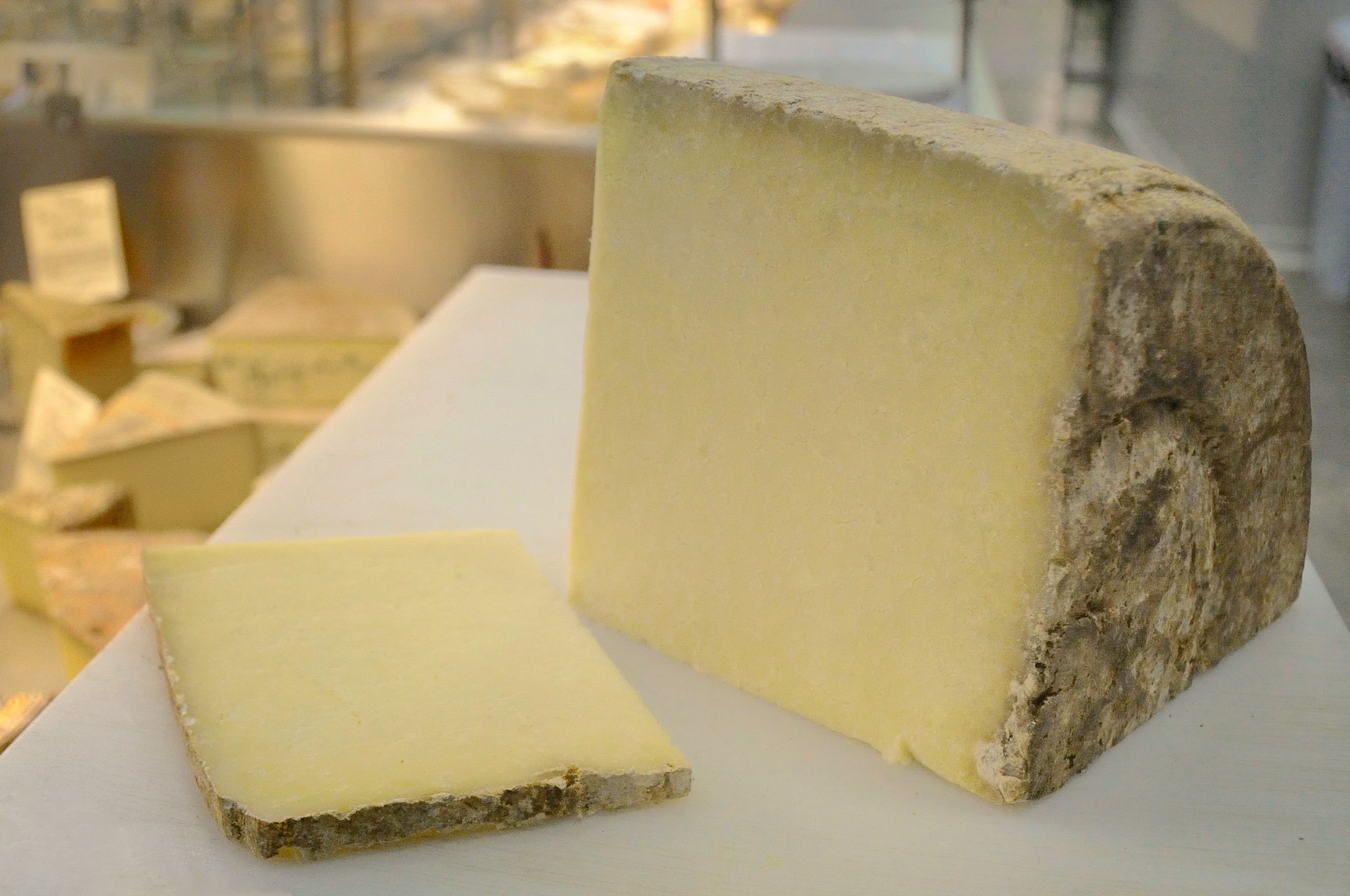
Laguiole

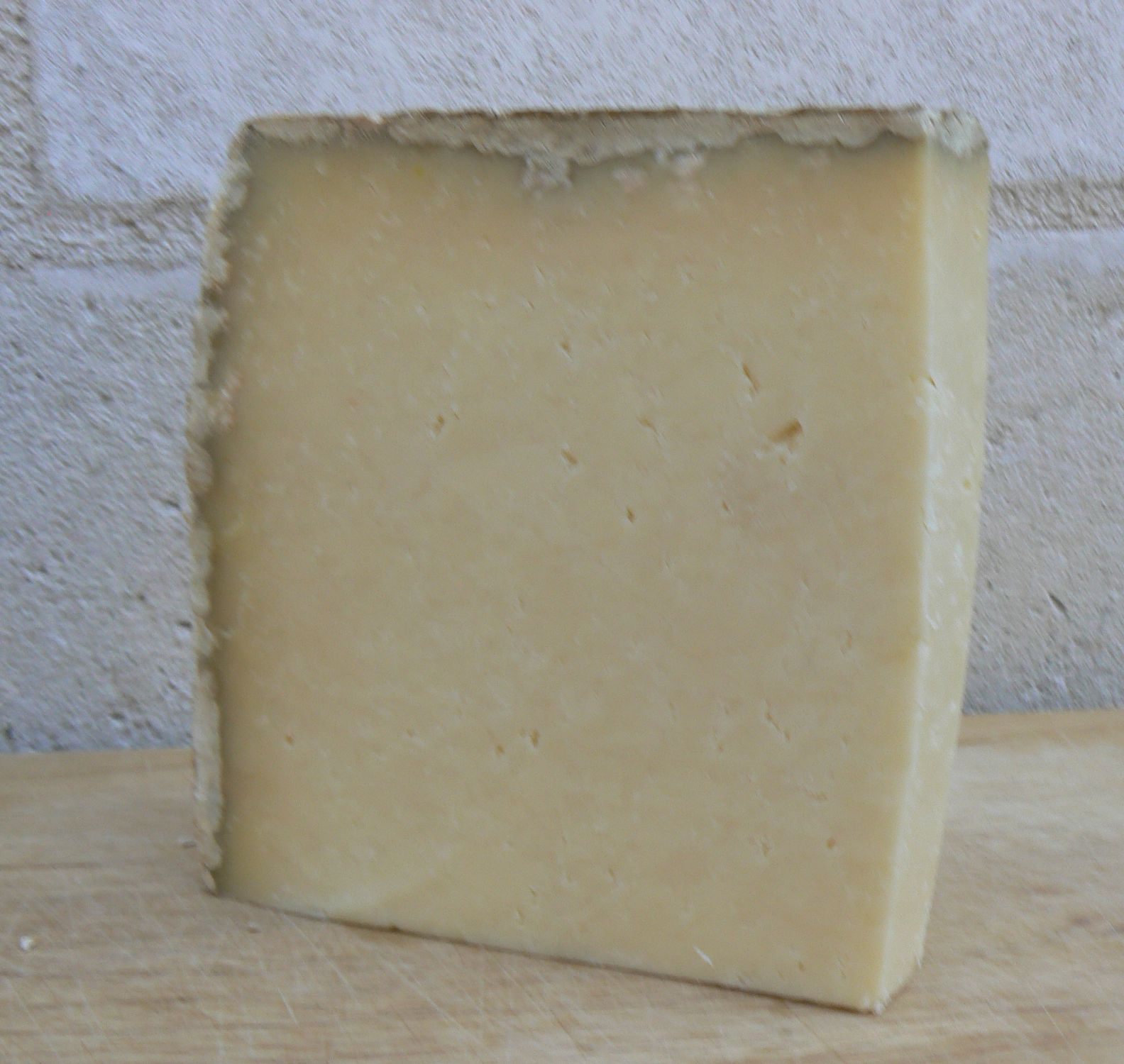
Cantal

== Preparation ==
Sautée the onions, garlic cloves, and shredded cabbage in butter until brown. Sprinkle flour into onion mixture and add a chopped tomato. Progressively add white wine, broth, pepper and salt. Simmer with cover.

In a large ovenproof dish, alternate layers of dry bread, shredded cheese, and shredded cabbage until the dish is full. Mix the onion/broth mixture before pouring over dish. Top with a final layer of grated cheese. Cook until cheese is fully melted and has begun to brown. (Some prefer not to gratinate and simply stir before serving.)

== Cheese soup in literature ==
La soupe au fromage was celebrated by Alphonse Daudet in a chapter frmo his collection of short stories Contes du lundi. Between each paragraph in the chapter, a food lover chants

Oh! The good smell of cheese soup!...

The chapter concludes with the following sentence:

The stomach made hungry by all the emotions and tirades, he felt at home, seated at his little table, and his gaze moved from Cinna to Maxime with a sweet smile of tenderness, as if he already saw the pretty white threads stretched out at the tip of the spoon, when the cheese soup is cooked to perfection, simmered well and served hot...

== See also ==
- Occitan cuisine and Auvergne cuisine
