= Guthuk =

Tibetan stew

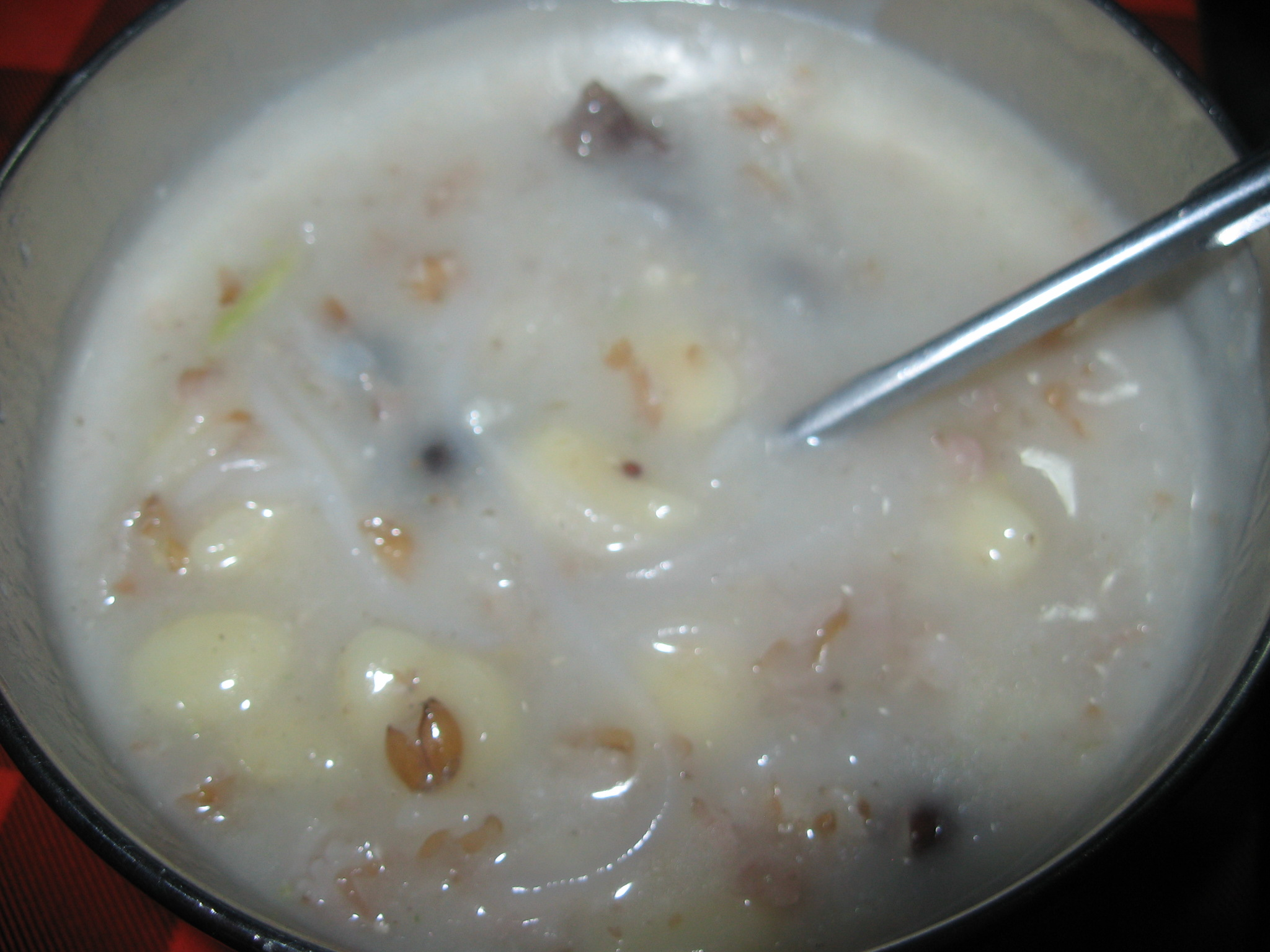
- Guthuk
- Type: Stew Soup
- Place of origin: Amdo, Tibet
- Region or state: Tibet, Nepal, Qinghai, Sichuan
- Associated cuisine: Tibetan cuisine
- Created by: Tibetan people
- Main ingredients: beans, vegetables, meat

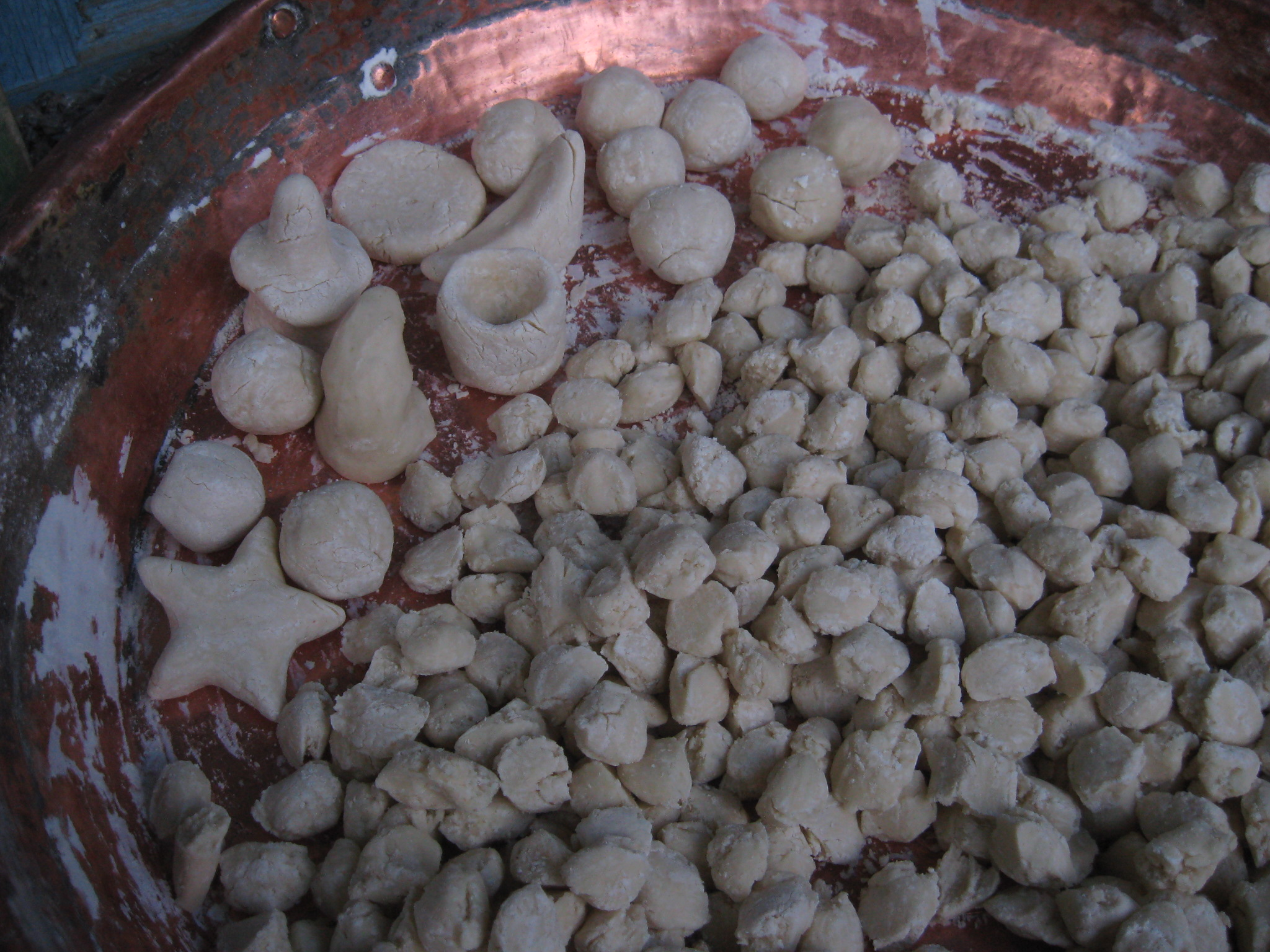
Various dumplings for guthuk that serve as symbols

Guthuk (Tibetan: དགུ་ཐུག་, English: 'Gu= 9, Thuk= stew soup ' or 29 date of Bot calendar celebrate so called Guthuk) is a stew soup in Sherpa or Tibetan cuisine, made with various ingredients like beans, vegetables, meat, or left over harvested grains. It is eaten two days before Losar, the Bot or Tibetan New Year (Note: "Guthuk is a special dish prepared for the Losar celebration. In it are dumplings that contain omens: a pebble symbolizes a long, healthy life; cayenne pepper suggests that the individual has a temperamental personality; a piece of charcoal ...") and is a variation on thukpa bhatuk. The Tibetan religious ceremony Gutor (དགུ་གཏོར), literally meaning 'offering of the 29th', is held on the 29th of the 12th Bot or Tibetan month, and is focused on driving out all negativity, including evil spirits and misfortunes of the past year, and starting the new year in a peaceful and auspicious way. It is made with barley and other ingredients.

== Banishing evil spirits day ==
The temples and monasteries throughout Tibet hold grand religious dance ceremonies, with the largest at Potala Palace in Lhasa. Families clean their houses on this day, decorate the rooms and eat guthuk. In the evening, the people carry torches, calling out the words of exorcism.

On that day the monasteries do a protector deities' ritual (a special kind of ritual) and begin preparations for the Losar celebrations. The custom that day is to make guthuk of nine different ingredients including dried cheese and various grains. Also, dough balls are given out with various ingredients hidden in them such as chilies, salt, wool, rice and coal. The ingredients one finds hidden in one's dough ball are supposed to be a lighthearted comment on one's character. If a person finds chilies in their dough, it means they are talkative. If white-colored ingredients like salt, wool or rice are inside the dough it is considered a good sign. If a person finds coal in the dough it has much the same meaning as finding coal in one's Christmas stocking; it means one has a "black heart".

== See also ==
- List of soups
- List of Tibetan dishes
