= Mote de queso =

Colombian soup dish

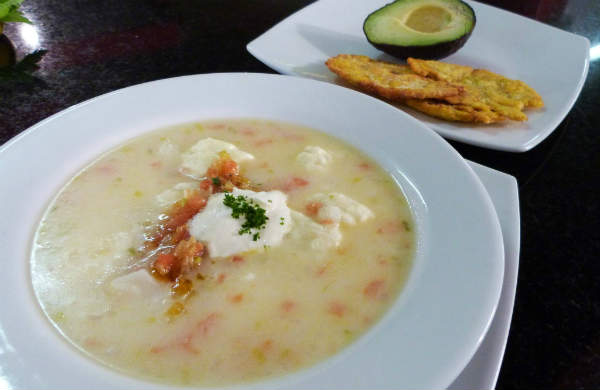
- Type: soup
- Place of origin: Colombia

Mote de queso is a Colombian soup dish. It is originally from the country's Atlantic coast and is made with ñame (yam) and Costeño cheese. It is eaten in the Caribbean area of Colombia and is a traditional dish of Corozal, Sucre, Colombia.

== See also ==
- Suero
- Queso costeño
