= Tibetan cheese =

Food Staple

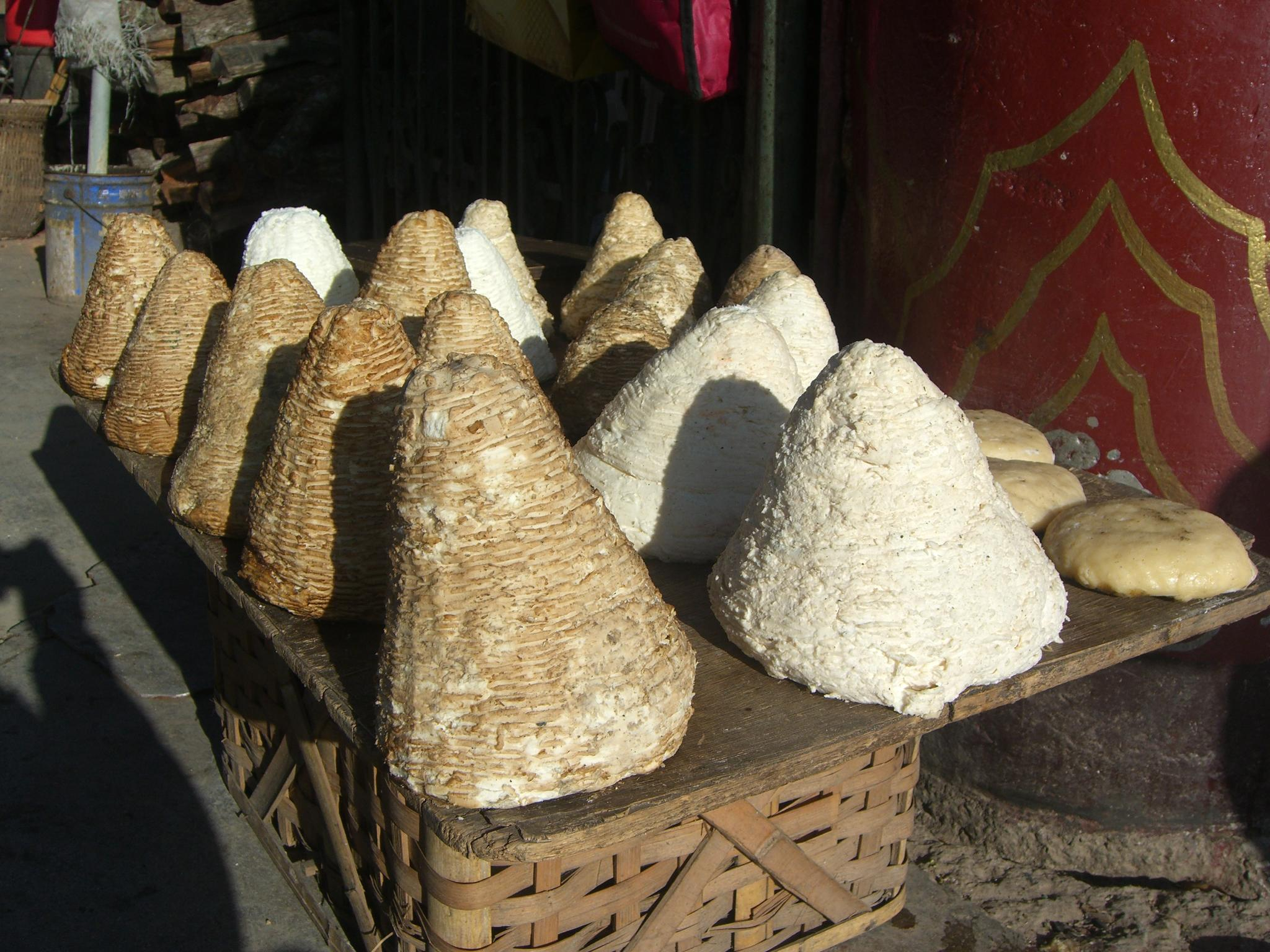
Examples of Tibetan cheese.

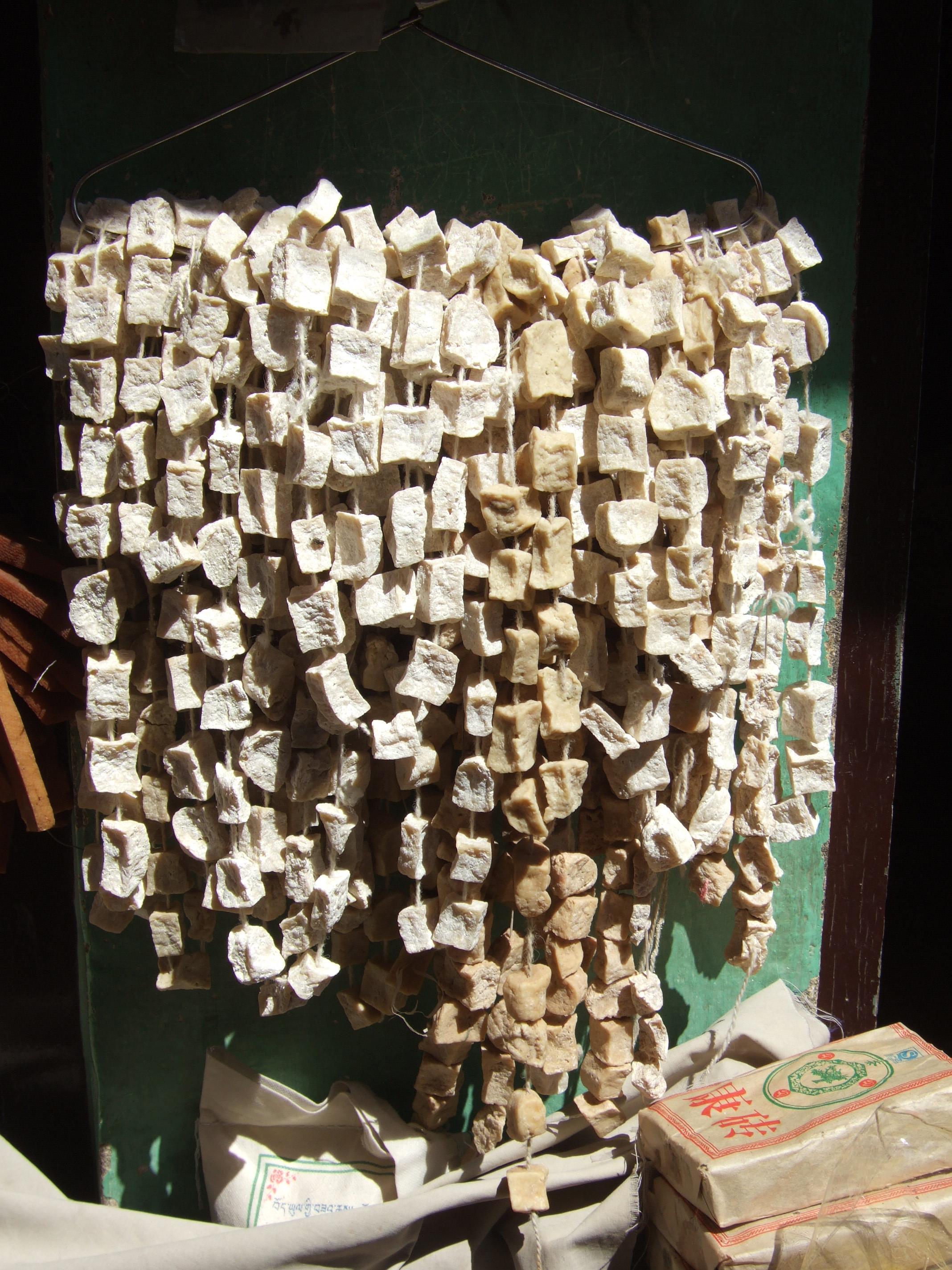
Tibetan hard cheese.

Tibetan cheese is a food staple in Tibetan cuisine. Tibetan cheeses include soft cheese curds resembling cottage cheese made from buttermilk called chura loenpa (or ser). Hard cheese is called chura kampo. Extra hard cheese, made from solidified yogurt, is called chhurpi, and is also found in Sikkim and Nepal. Another type of cheese called shosha or churul, with a flavor said to resemble Limburger, is made from cream and the skin of milk.

== See also ==
- List of Tibetan dishes
- List of cheeses
