= Tibetan cuisine =

Culinary traditions of Tibet

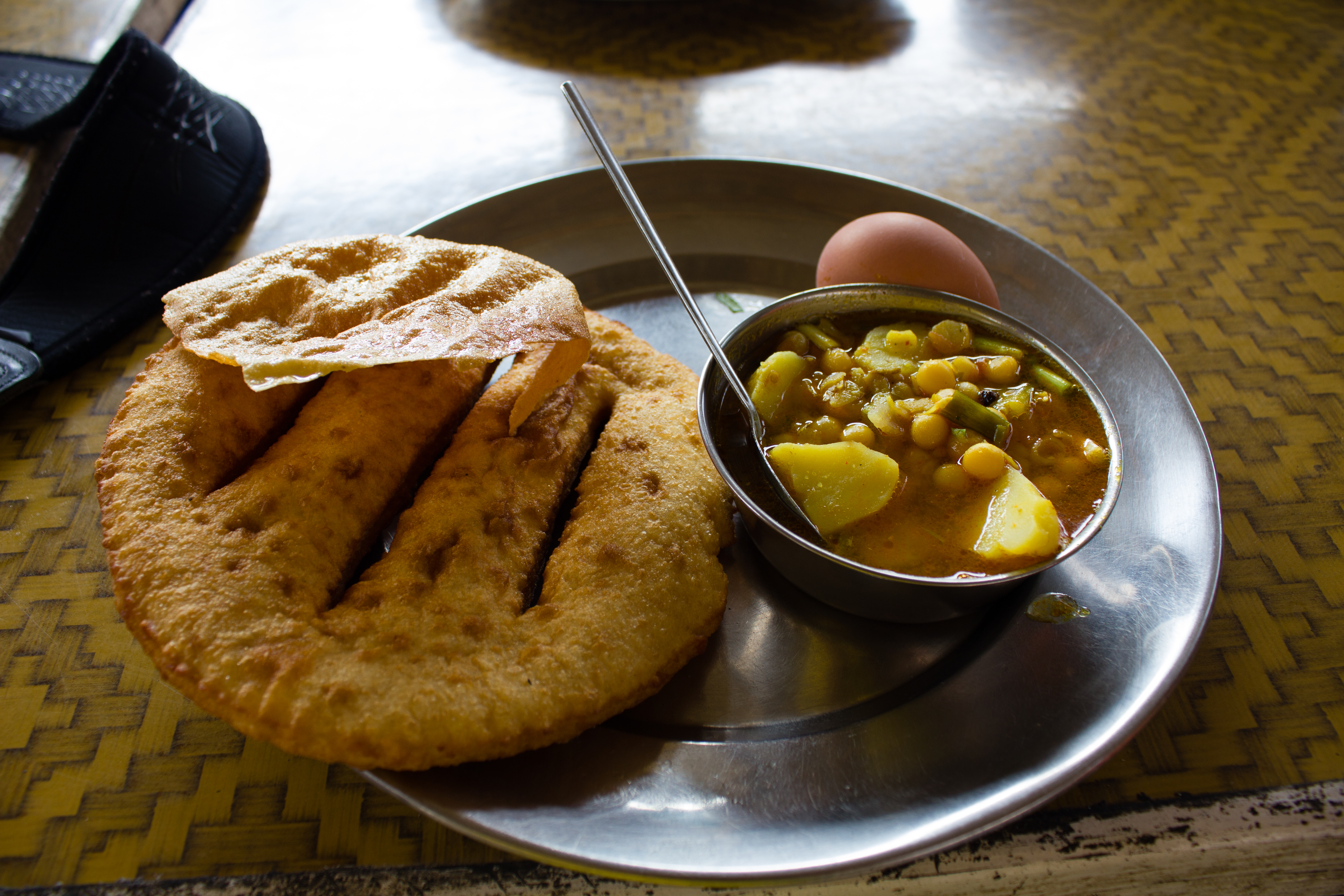
A simple Tibetan breakfast

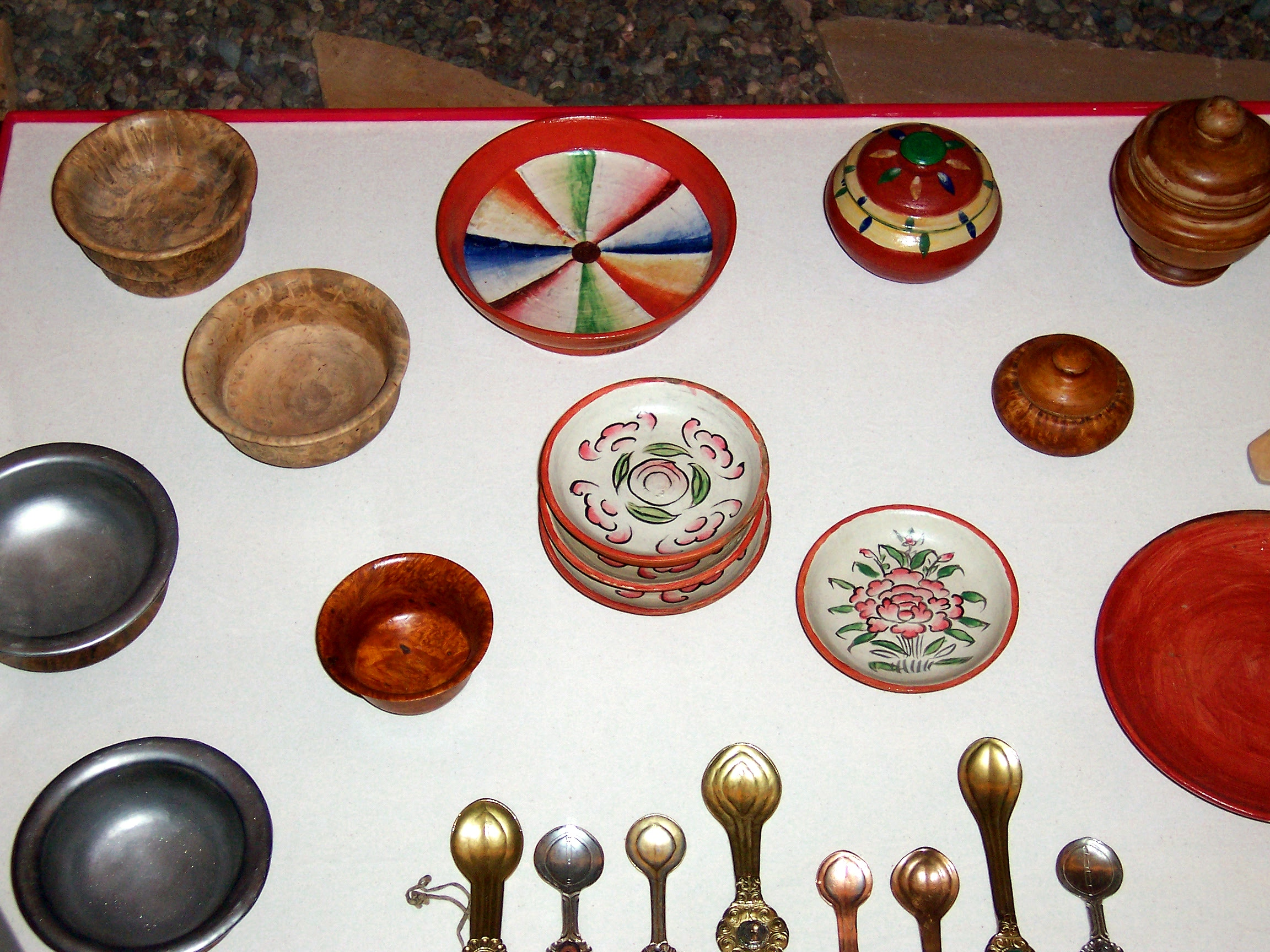
Tibetan bowls and spoons, Field Museum

Tibetan cuisine includes the culinary traditions and practices of the Tibetan people in the Tibet region. The cuisine reflects the Tibetan landscape of mountains and plateaus and includes influences from neighbors (including India and Nepal where many Tibetans abide). It is known for its use of noodles, goat, yak, mutton, dumplings, cheese (often from yak or goat milk), butter, yogurt (also from animals adapted to the Tibetan climate), and soups. Vegetarianism has been debated by religious practitioners since the 11th century but is not prevalent due to the difficulty of growing vegetables, and cultural traditions promoting consumption of meat.

Crops must be able to grow at high altitudes, although a few areas are at low enough altitude to grow crops such as rice, oranges, bananas and lemons. The most important crop is barley. Flour milled from roasted barley, called tsampa, is the staple food of Tibet, as well as sha phaley (meat and cabbage in bread). Balep is Tibetan bread eaten for breakfast and lunch. Various other types of balep bread and fried pies are consumed. Thukpa is a dinner staple consisting of vegetables, meat, and noodles of various shapes in broth. Tibetan cuisine is traditionally served with silverware, in contrast to other Himalayan cuisines, which are eaten by hand. Mustard seeds are cultivated and feature heavily in its cuisine.

Outside of the Tibet Autonomous Region, Tibetan cuisine is consumed in the Indian states of Ladakh, Himachal Pradesh, Uttarakhand, Sikkim, northern regions of Nepal such as Mustang and by Tibetan diaspora communities.

In larger Tibetan towns and cities, many restaurants now serve Sichuan-style Han Chinese food. Western imports and fusion dishes, such as fried yak and chips, are also popular. Nevertheless, many small restaurants serving traditional Tibetan dishes persist in both cities and the countryside.

== Food culture ==
=== Cookware ===
Tibetans use pots, pans, cans, steamer pots and boxes made from various materials. Tibetan women carry large wooden containers, which can hold up to 25 liters, to fetch water once a day. Returning to the house, they pour the water into built-in copper cans that hold more than 100 liters. Cooking pots made from iron or brass are used on the stove. Traditionally, pans were used rarely, but are becoming increasingly popular. Wooden boxes are used to store tsampa, butter and cheese. Tibetans use elaborately woven baskets with matching lids to store dried fruits, rice and sugar. When travelling, they use the baskets to store dried meat and cheese. In Southern Tibet, mortars are indispensable for crushing chilis.

=== Dinnerware ===
Tibetan dinnerware is traditionally made from wood, but sometimes lacquered clay is used. According to local tradition, this handicraft was passed down for generations. Those who could afford to do so purchased high-quality porcelain bowls from elsewhere. In more modern times, other types of porcelain from China or elsewhere are used. Spoons are indispensable for most dishes. Poor people and children wore them around their necks to allow constant and easy access. Knives are sometimes used to eat fruits. Tibetans also use small soup bowls, while the rich used bowls of gold and silver.

== Tea ==
Teacups are sometimes carried in the abdominal fold of the Chuba, a traditional costume. Wooden teacups made from dzabija wood are considered especially fine. They have a smooth surface, an impressive grain pattern and are made with a balanced form, which relates to the composition of the raw wood. They are comfortable to hold. The cups are costly and most cannot afford them. Lavish teacups often have a layer of silver inside, which is intended to make them easier to clean. The nobility and high lamas used stands and tops that were intricately ornamented with mythological motifs. The tops are used to preserve the scent of the tea. The most precious cups shipped from other provinces are made from white jade. They have no handles. The best teacups are made from metal or silver, which are used only for guests and on festival days. The silversmiths from Derge are known for their exquisite tea sets. Teapots are typically made from wood or clay, while the better ones are made from lavishly ornamented metals such as copper or brass.

The Dongmo is a tea-mixing cylinder used for making Tibetan butter tea. It usually has a volume of around 4 litres and is made from wood ornamented with brass. A whisk is placed in a hole on the top of the Dongmo and, with 15-20 vertical movements, the butter tea emulsifies.

=== Monastic kitchens ===
Tibetan monks are self-sufficient. They cook for themselves and raise money by praying for farmers and nomads or by performing rituals for the well-being of families. In monastery kitchens, large pots are used to make soups. During breaks in religious studies, the monks are served tea and soup. Novice monks walk through the rows and pour tea from richly decorated teapots.

== Etiquette ==
Friendliness, hospitality, generosity and selflessness, derived from the principles of Tibetan Buddhism, are the basis of local etiquette. Behaviour which is egocentric or egoistic is regarded as inappropriate, and helping/supporting others is idealized. Combined with their belief in Karma - that everything that happens in life has a source in actions committed in the past - they easily process a loss, sickness or great misfortune as they believe this relieves them from the effects of past actions.

Guests witness this attitude. Upon arriving, a guest receives a Khata - a white silk scarf - that symbolizes joy for the visit and reverence for the guest. After entering, a guest's comfort and well-being is cared for in every way, including cooking. The guest may be offered tea, but instead of accepting immediately, the guest is culturally expected to politely decline - the guest too has to be exemplary. Without hesitating, the host (customarily the woman of the house) immediately serves the tea. The host pours and hands over the cup with both hands as a sign of respect. In the common protocol, the guest only takes a small sip before putting the cup down. The host will fill up the cup and ask the guest to drink again. This is repeated two more times before the guest empties the cup slowly. If the guest leaves the cup filled without drinking, this is regarded as a signal of contentment. Without asking, the cup will be taken away and the guest will often be offered Chang (barley beer). At the table, expectations are that individuals sit cross-legged, and it is considered impolite to stretch one's legs. In addition, one should never pass over body parts of another. Pastries may be served with tea. Offered a meal, the guest may politely refuse at first. Upon subsequent offering, the host may find out what the guest wants.

The goal of every host is to create a relaxed atmosphere and to give joy and pleasure.

== Dishes ==
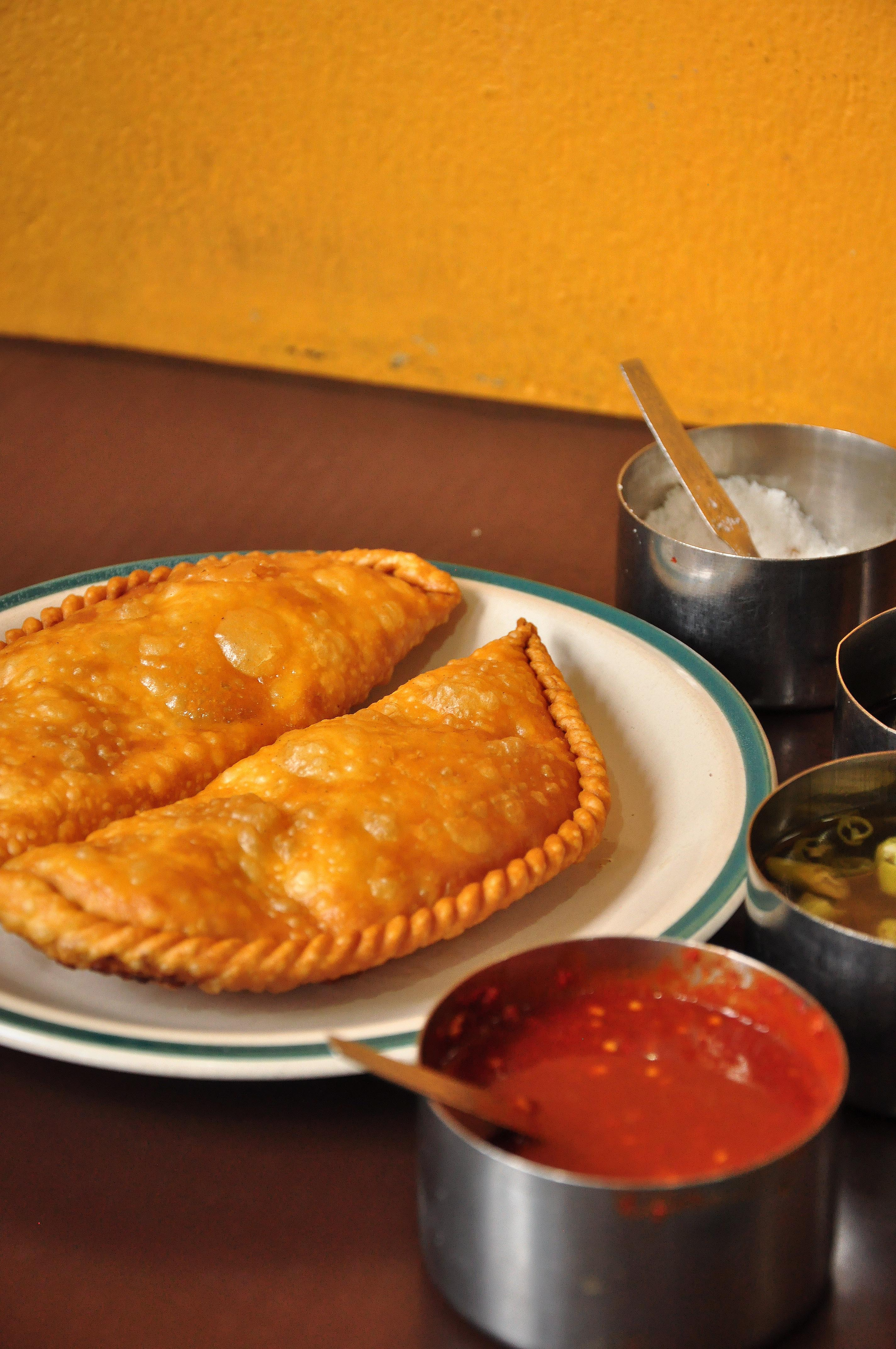
Tibetan snack Sha Phaley in Nepal

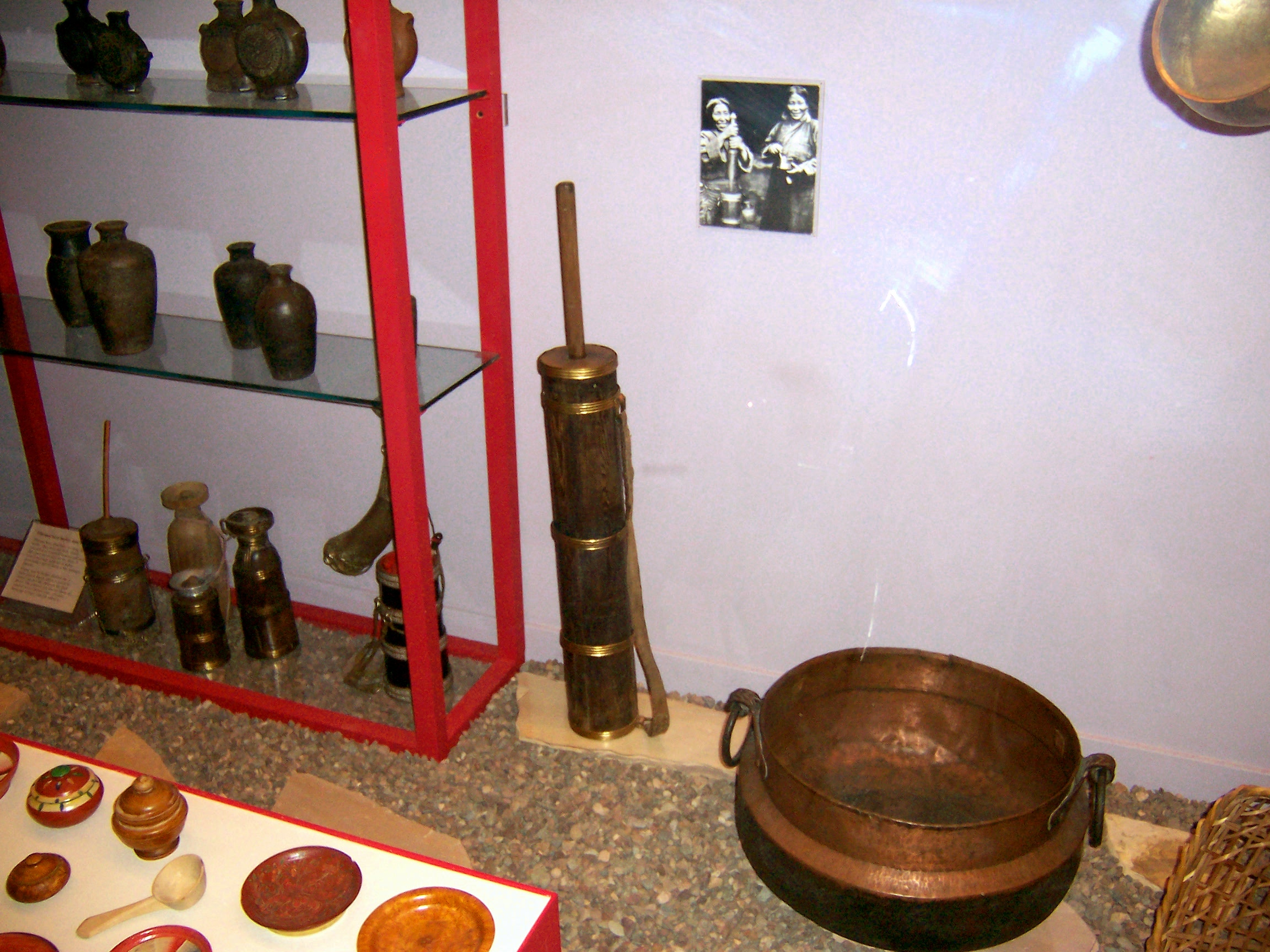
Tibetan kitchen items including a small butter churn with shoulder strap, suitable for nomadic life, cooking pot, bowls, and spoons

Other Tibetan foods include:

- Sha Phaley - bread stuffed with seasoned beef and cabbage, which is then fashioned into semi-circular or circular shapes and which, according to regional variations, is either deep fried or pan fried like pot stickers.
- Balep korkun - a central Tibetan flatbread cooked on a skillet rather than in an oven.
- Tingmo (food) - a type of steamed bun, a heavier version of the Han Chinese baozi.
- Thenthuk - a type of cold-weather soup made with noodles and various vegetables.
- Shab Ta - Stir-fried meat tossed with celery, carrots and fresh green chili.
- Gyurma (Juema) - a blood sausage with yak or sheep's blood and roasted barley flour or rice as filler
- Sokham Bexe - fried dough, with butter and minced meat. It is said to be a favourite of the Dalai Lama and the Panchen Lama.
- Dtowa Katsa - stewed tripe, with curry, fennel, monosodium glutamate and salt.
- Lunggoi Katsa - stewed sheep's head, with curry, fennel, monosodium glutamate and salt.
- Thue (cake) - a cheese cake pastry made with yak butter, brown sugar and water.
- Masan - a pastry, made with tsampa, dry cubic or curd cheese, yak butter, brown sugar and water.
- Shogo Momo - a type of momo using mashed potato with dough, shaped into balls, with a minced meat filling, served with bread crumbs.
- Samkham Papleg - fried dough with yak butter or rapeseed oil.

=== Breads and fried dough foods ===
- Papza Mogu - dough balls with melted butter, brown sugar, and dry curd cheese. They have a sweet and sour taste and are red in color.

=== Soups ===
- De-Thuk - a type of gruel that includes yak or sheep stock along with rice, different types of Tibetan cheeses. Similar to Cantonese rice congee
- Tsam-thuk - a type of gruel that uses yak or sheep stock and roasted barley flour as well as a variety of Tibetan cheeses.
- Thukpa bhatuk - a common Tibetan noodle soup made with little bhasta noodles.

=== Sweet foods ===
- Day-see - a Tibetan sweet dish with rice cooked in unsalted butter and mixed with raisins, droma (gourd shaped root found), dates and nuts. This dish is usually served only on Losar (Tibetan New Year).
- Khapsey - Tibetan cookies or biscuits that are deep fried and made during celebrations such as the Tibetan New Year or weddings. Khapseys are fashioned into many different intricate shapes and textures. Some are sprinkled with powdered sugar while other shapes such as the donkey ear-shaped khapseys are used for decoration.

=== Desserts ===
- Thue

=== Holiday dishes ===
- Guthuk - is traditionally eaten before Losar
- Khapse - pastries for Losar called nyapsha
- Changkol (food)

== Cheeses, yogurt and butter ==
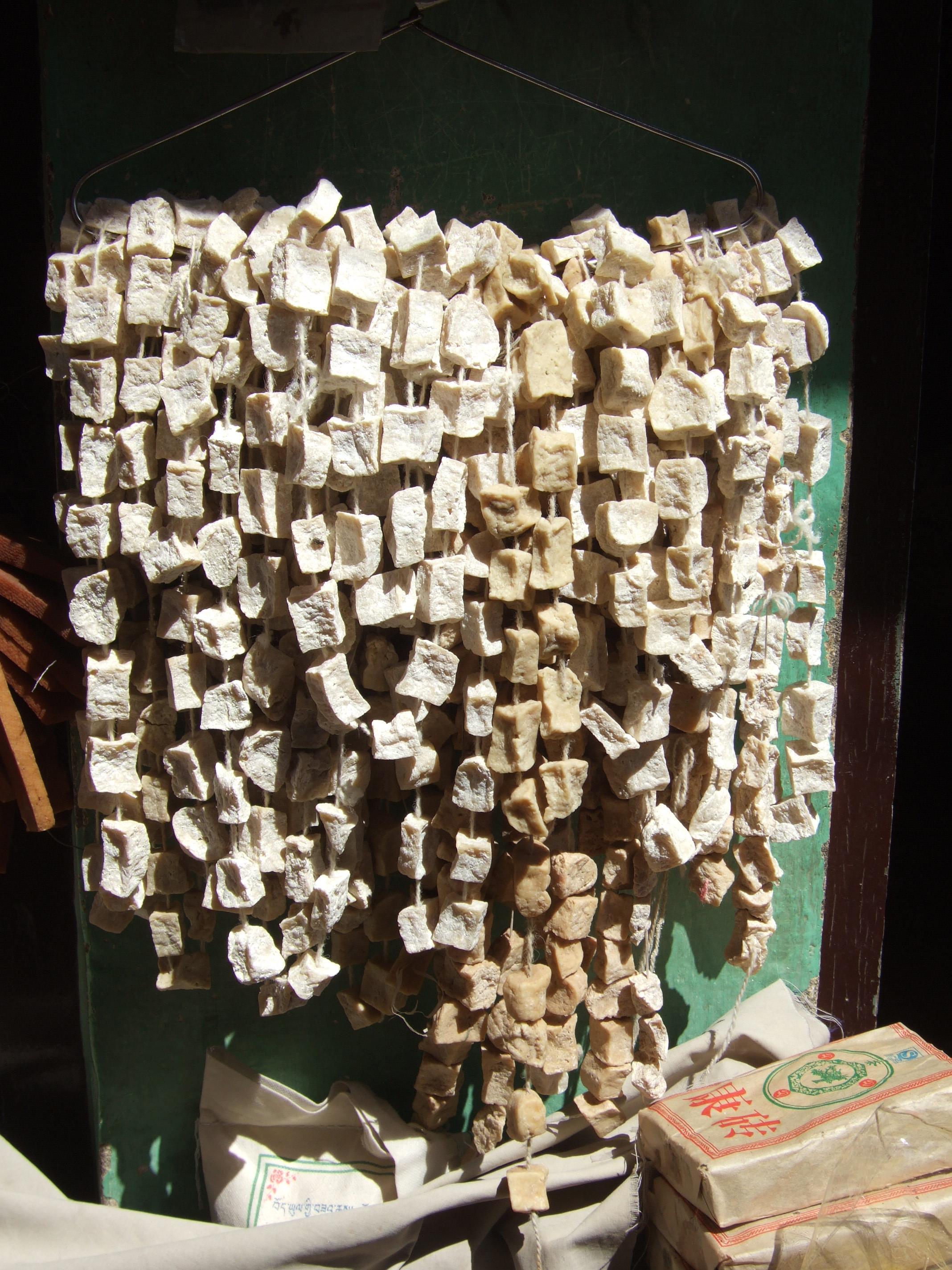
A type of Tibetan cheese

Tibetan cheeses, yogurt and butter are staples. Varieties include soft cheese curds resembling cottage cheese made from buttermilk called chura loenpa (or ser). Hard cheese is called chura kampo. Extra hard cheese, made from solidified yogurt, is called chhurpi, and is also found in Sikkim and Nepal. Another type of cheese called shosha or churul, with a flavor said to resemble Limburger, is also eaten. It is made from cream and the skin of milk.

== Beverages ==
Most Tibetans drink many cups of yak butter tea daily. Jasmine tea is also sometimes available.

Brick tea is made by methods only distantly related to those employed in China or Sri Lanka (Ceylon). When the water boils, a great handful of the stuff is crumbled into it and allowed to stew for between five and ten minutes, until the whole infusion is so opaque that it looks almost black. At this stage a pinch of salt is added; the Tibetans always put salt, never sugar, in their tea. I have been told that they sometimes add a little soda, in order to give the beverage a pinkish tinge, but I never saw this done in Sikang. They very seldom, on the other hand, drink tea without butter in it. If you are at home, you empty the saucepan into a big wooden churn, straining the tea through a colander made of reed or horsehair. Then you drop a large lump of butter into it, and, after being vigorously stirred, this brew is transferred to a huge copper teapot and put on a brazier to keep it hot. When you are traveling, you do not normally take a churn with you, so everyone fills his wooden bowl with tea, scoops a piece of butter out of a basket, puts it in the bowl, stirs the mixture gently with his finger, and, finally, drinks the tea.

Butter tea is the national beverage. Although butter tea is the most popular tea, black tea is also fairly popular. Jasmine grows in Eastern Tibet. Most likely, Tibetans took absorbed jasmine tea from the Han Chinese cultural sphere. Spice tea is very popular among exiles who live in India and Nepal. It is almost unknown in Tibet. Most likely, it was adopted from Indian culture. Dara is the Tibetan word for buttermilk. It refers to the yogurt drink. It is also used for Indian Lassi.

=== Alcoholic beverages ===
Traditionally, Tibetan Buddhism prohibited the consumption of alcoholic beverages. Beer mostly from barley, but rice, wheat, maize, oats and millet are also used in brewing. Chang is consumed through a thin bamboo straw.

Alcoholic beverages include:

- Beer
- Chang, a beer usually made from barley
- Pinjopo, a rice wine
- Ara, distilled or fermented grain alcohol
- Tongba, a millet based alcoholic beverage

== Ingredients ==
Barley has been a staple food since the fifth century AD. It is made into a flour product called tsampa which is still a staple. The flour is roasted and mixed with butter and butter tea to form a stiff dough that is eaten in small balls.
