= Shosha (cheese) =

Tibetan cheese

Shosha, also known as churul or churu, is a type of soft cheese in Tibetan cuisine. Tibetan cheese is a staple food and is often made from animals suited to the climate such as yak and goat. It is a pungent cheese compared with blue cheese. It is used to make beef dishes and churu cheese soup.

== See also ==
- List of Tibetan dishes
