= 2012 in Togo =

- Decades: 1990s; 2000s; 2010s; 2020s
- See also: Other events of 2012; History of Togo

Events of the year 2012 in Togo

== Incumbents ==
- President: Faure Gnassingbé
- Prime Minister: Gilbert Houngbo (until July 23), Kwesi Ahoomey-Zunu (after July 23)

== Events ==
- January 15: Togolese government officials announce reopening of the University of Lomé after student protesting shut it down in the previous year
- January 17: American Secretary of State Hillary Clinton visits Lomé as part of a tour in West Africa
- February 29: Government calls for sanctions against members of the Togolese National Intelligence for their roles in a previous coup
- March 29: President of Ghana John Atta Mills ends his diplomatic trip to the country
- April 13: Ghana and Togo approve a transnational water supply project between Lomé and Sogakope
- May 18: Human rights groups speak out against unsanitary conditions of the Lomé prison which led to prisoner deaths
- June 12: Beginning of 2012–2013 Togolese protests
- June 14: "Several dozen" civilians are injured by police during protests
- June 17: Two civilian protestors die from injuries sustained from police forces
- June 19: Former Prime Minister Agbéyomé Kodjo is "briefly" arrested in his home by police
- September 3: The African Development Bank pledges 56 billion CFA francs to help Togo repair border roads near Burkina Faso
- September 20: Thousands of women protest in Togolese capital for government reforms

== Establishments ==
- Let's Save Togo Collective (April 4)
- New Togolese Commitment (April 28)
- Rainbow Alliance
- Union for the Republic
- University of Science and Technology of Togo
