= ANR =

ANR may refer to:

== People ==
- Akkineni Nageswara Rao, Indian actor and producer in Telugu cinema
- Akkineni Nagarjuna Rao, Indian actor

== Places ==
- Antwerp International Airport (IATA code)

== Organizations ==
- Agence nationale de la recherche, a French funding agency for research
- Agence nationale des renseignements (Togo), a Togolese intelligence agency
- Agence nationale de renseignement, a Democratic Republic of the Congo intelligence agency
- Alleanza Nazzjonali Repubblikana, a Maltese pressure group
- Alliance Nationale Républicaine (National Republican Alliance), an Algerian political party
- Americans for Nonsmokers' Rights, an American organization that lobbies in support of smoking bans
- Asociación Nacional Republicana (National Republican Association), a Paraguayan political party
- Australian National Railways Commission, Australian rail operator from 1975 until 1987
- Agencja Nieruchomości Rolnych, Polish estate agency

== Land use and planning ==
- Approval Not Required (Under the Subdivision Control Law), a process for subdividing land in Massachusetts, US, under MGL Chapter 41

== Mathematics ==
- Absolute neighborhood retract, a type of topological space (mathematics)

== Military ==
- Alaska NORAD Region, an alternate phrase for the Eleventh Air Force
- Agence Nationale de Renseignements, a government intelligence agency of the Zaire
- Aeronautica Nazionale Repubblicana, the air force of the Italian Social Republic during World War II

== Music ==
- Anew Revolution, a heavy metal band from Austin, Texas
- Awesome New Republic, a two-piece indie band from Miami, Florida

== Technology ==
- Active Noise Reduction, more commonly Active noise control
- Ambiguous name resolution, a search algorithm for LDAP implemented in Microsoft's Active Directory
- "Application not Responding", a message in Android operating system
- Atmosphere Normale de Reference, a standard used with air compressors
- Automatic Number-plate Recognition, more commonly ANPR (automatic number-plate recognition)

== Other uses ==
- Adult Nursing Relationship, a type of erotic relationship (see Erotic lactation)
