= Member states of the International Labour Organization =

List of states in the UN agency

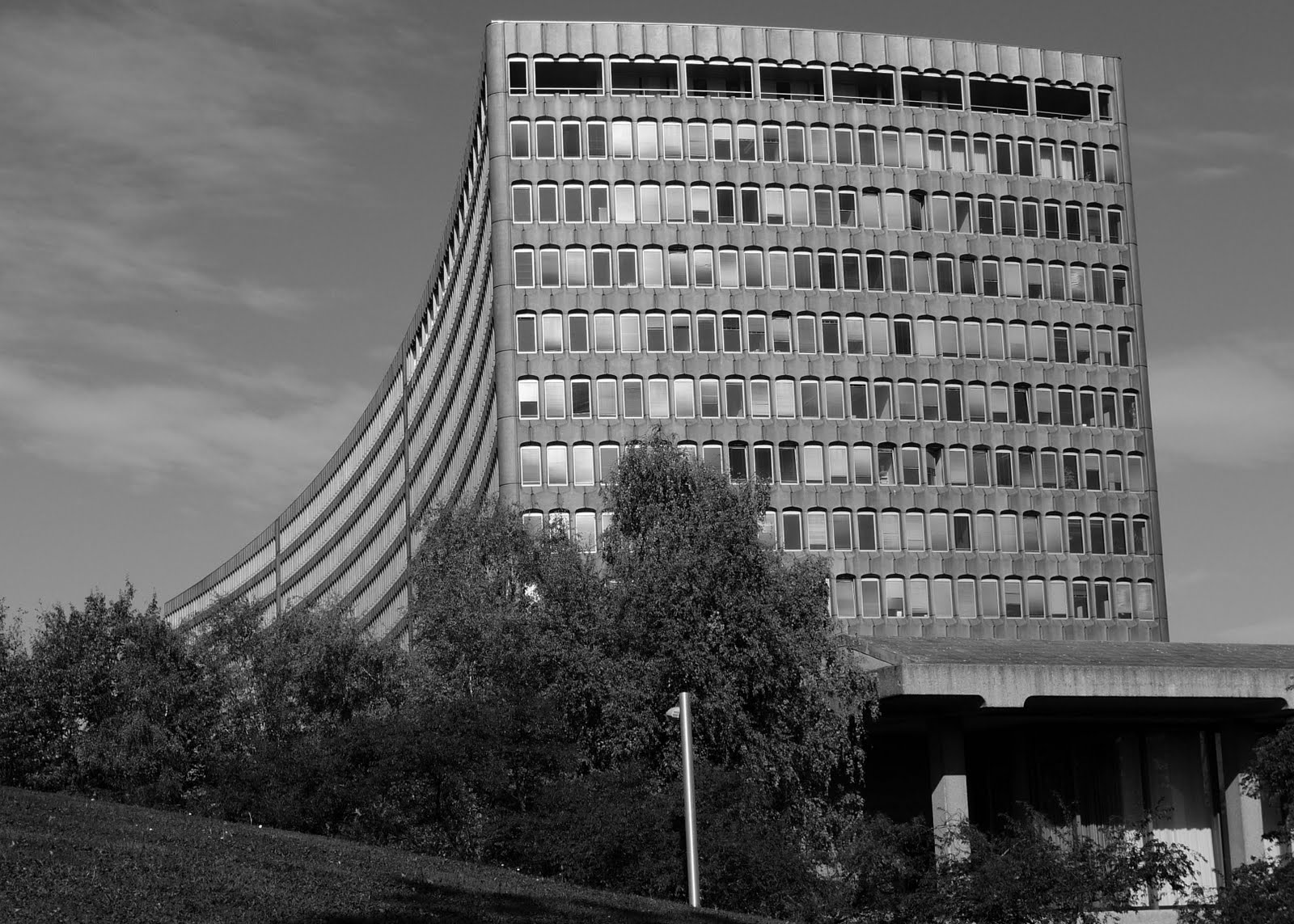
ILO headquarters, Geneva

The International Labour Organization (ILO), a tripartite specialized agency of the United Nations that sets international standards related to work, has 187 member states, as of February 2025. Established in 1919 as a result of the Treaty of Versailles, the ILO was the first agency to be incorporated into the UN in 1946, is the third oldest pre-existing UN agency, the fourth oldest existing multilateral organization and the only remaining organization with direct links to the League of Nations. (Note: The three older existing organizations are the Central Commission for Navigation on the Rhine (1815), the International Telecommunication Union (1865) and the Universal Postal Union (1874). The ITU and the UPU are the oldest and second-oldest pre-existing UN agencies, respectively.)

The organization was established with 42 states, of which 29 states are considered founder members as signatories to the Versailles Treaty; another 13 states, not signatories, were invited to be members and granted status as founder members.

Following the Second World War and the dissolution of the League of Nations, the ILO became the UN's first specialized agency. All but one of the ILO's member states (the Cook Islands) are also member states of the United Nations. However, there are seven UN member states which have not joined the ILO. The ILO's constitution allows admission without membership in the UN, but the conditions to be satisfied in this case are more complex than for a UN member state.

Since establishment, 19 states have withdrawn from membership, although all subsequently rejoined. Two states have indicated an intention to withdraw, but did not complete the process. While the membership rules admit only sovereign states, on three occasions states with non-sovereign status have been admitted, all, however, eventually became sovereign members. Five states have been removed from membership, with all being readmitted. Six formerly-existing states have been members of the ILO, including two which were founding members.

== Member states ==
Membership in the ILO is governed by Article 1, clauses 3 and 4, of the organization's constitution. Clause 3 indicates that any UN member state may become a member of the ILO by communicating to the Director-General "formal acceptance of the obligations of the Constitution." Clause 4 allows for membership for non-UN states, but this requires a two-thirds vote by delegates to the International Labour Conference, including two-thirds of government delegates.

Current member states of the International Labour Organization
Flag	Member state	Date of admission	Notes
(Afghanistan)	Afghanistan	29 September 1934	
(Albania)	Albania	22 May 1991	Previously a member from 1920 to 1967, admitted 1991. Further information: member withdrawals
(Algeria)	Algeria	19 October 1962	
(Angola)	Angola	4 June 1976	
(Antigua and Barbuda)	Antigua and Barbuda	16 February 1982	
(Argentina)	Argentina *	28 June 1919	
(Armenia)	Armenia	26 November 1992	Prior participation as part of the Soviet Union
(Australia)	Australia +	28 June 1919	
(Austria)	Austria	24 June 1947	Previously a member from 1919 to 1938, readmitted 1947. Further information: member removals
(Azerbaijan)	Azerbaijan	19 May 1992	Prior participation as part of the Soviet Union
(The Bahamas)	Bahamas	25 May 1976	
(Bahrain)	Bahrain	18 April 1977	
(Bangladesh)	Bangladesh	22 June 1972	
(Barbados)	Barbados	8 May 1967	
(Belarus)	Belarus	12 May 1954	Admitted as the Byelorussian Soviet Socialist Republic. Further information: former non-sovereign state members
(Belgium)	Belgium +	28 June 1919	
(Belize)	Belize	7 November 1981	
(Benin)	Benin	14 December 1960	
(Bolivia)	Bolivia (Plurinational State of) +	28 June 1919	
(Bosnia and Herzegovina)	Bosnia and Herzegovina	2 June 1993	Prior participation as part of Yugoslavia
(Botswana)	Botswana	27 February 1978	
(Brazil)	Brazil +	28 June 1919	
(Brunei)	Brunei Darussalam	17 January 2007	
(Bulgaria)	Bulgaria	16 December 1920	
(Burkina Faso)	Burkina Faso	21 November 1960	
(Burundi)	Burundi	13 March 1963	
(Cape Verde)	Cabo Verde	3 April 1979	
(Cambodia)	Cambodia	24 February 1969	
(Cameroon)	Cameroon	7 June 1960	
(Canada)	Canada +	28 June 1919	
(Central African Republic)	Central African Republic	27 October 1960	
(Chad)	Chad	10 November 1960	
(Chile)	Chile *	28 June 1919	
(China)	China +	28 June 1919	Admitted as the Republic of China. From the Chinese Communist Revolution of 1949 through to 1971, China's membership in the ILO was held by the Republic of China (Taiwan). Following a resolution at the 184th meeting of the ILO Governing Body in 1971, the People's Republic of China (PRC) was recognized as the representative government of China for the purposes of membership. However, not until June 1983 did the PRC agree to participate in ILO activities when the International Labour Conference agreed to waive outstanding dues of over $38 million (equivalent to $103 million in 2024).
(Colombia)	Colombia *	28 June 1919	
(Comoros)	Comoros	23 October 1978	
(Republic of the Congo)	Congo	10 November 1960	
(Cook Islands)	Cook Islands	12 June 2015	Not a United Nations member state, admitted to the ILO by resolution adopted at the 104th session of the International Labour Conference.
(Costa Rica)	Costa Rica	21 February 1944	Previously a member from 1920 to 1927, admitted 1944. Further information: member withdrawals
(Ivory Coast)	Côte d'Ivoire	21 September 1960	
(Croatia)	Croatia	30 June 1992	Prior participation as part of Yugoslavia
(Cuba)	Cuba +	28 June 1919	
(Cyprus)	Cyprus	23 September 1960	
(Czech Republic)	Czech Republic	3 February 1993	Prior participation as part of Czechoslovakia
(Democratic Republic of the Congo)	Democratic Republic of the Congo	20 September 1960	
(Denmark)	Denmark *	28 June 1919	
(Djibouti)	Djibouti	3 April 1978	
(Dominica)	Dominica	17 June 1982	
(Dominican Republic)	Dominican Republic	29 September 1924	
(Ecuador)	Ecuador	28 September 1934	
(Egypt)	Egypt	19 June 1936	Admitted without being a member of the League of Nations.
(El Salvador)	El Salvador *	21 June 1948	Previously a member from 1919 to 1939, admitted 1948. Further information: member withdrawals
(Equatorial Guinea)	Equatorial Guinea	31 January 1981	
(Eritrea)	Eritrea	7 June 1993	
(Estonia)	Estonia	13 January 1992	Member as Estonia 1921–1940, as part of the Soviet Union 1954–1991, readmitted 1992. Further information: member removals
(Eswatini)	Eswatini	20 May 1975	
(Ethiopia)	Ethiopia	28 September 1923	Between 1939 and 1942 Ethiopia was removed from the membership list due to annexation by Italy. Further information: member removals
(Fiji)	Fiji	19 April 1974	
(Finland)	Finland	16 December 1920	
(France)	France +	28 June 1919	
(Gabon)	Gabon	14 October 1960	
(The Gambia)	Gambia	29 May 1995	
(Georgia (country))	Georgia	22 June 1993	Prior participation as part of the Soviet Union
(Germany)	Germany	12 June 1951	Previously a member from 1919 to 1935, admitted 1951. Further information: member withdrawals
(Ghana)	Ghana	20 May 1957	
(Greece)	Greece +	28 June 1919	
(Grenada)	Grenada	9 July 1979	
(Guatemala)	Guatemala +	19 October 1945	Previously a member from 1919 to 1938, admitted in 1945. Further information: member withdrawals
(Guinea)	Guinea	21 January 1959	
(Guinea-Bissau)	Guinea-Bissau	21 February 1977	
(Guyana)	Guyana	8 June 1966	
(Haiti)	Haiti +	28 June 1919	
(Honduras)	Honduras +	1 January 1955	Member from 1919 to 1938, admitted 1955. Further information: member withdrawals
(Hungary)	Hungary	18 September 1922	
(Iceland)	Iceland	19 October 1945	
(India)	India +	28 June 1919	
(Indonesia)	Indonesia	12 May 1950	Indonesia communicated an intention to withdraw from the ILO in 1965, however, this was rescinded in 1966. Further information: incomplete member withdrawals
(Iran)	Iran (Islamic Republic of) *	28 June 1919	Admitted as Persia
(Iraq)	Iraq	3 October 1932	
(Republic of Ireland)	Ireland	10 September 1923	
(Israel)	Israel	10 May 1949	
(Italy)	Italy +	19 October 1945	Previously a member from 1919 to 1940, admitted 1945. Further information: member withdrawals
(Jamaica)	Jamaica	26 December 1962	
(Japan)	Japan	26 November 1951	Previously a member from 1919 to 1940, admitted 1951. Further information: member withdrawals
(Jordan)	Jordan	26 January 1956	
(Kazakhstan)	Kazakhstan	31 May 1993	Prior participation as part of the Soviet Union
(Kenya)	Kenya	13 January 1964	
(Kiribati)	Kiribati	3 February 2000	
(Kuwait)	Kuwait	13 June 1961	
(Kyrgyzstan)	Kyrgyzstan	31 March 1992	Prior participation as part of the Soviet Union
(Laos)	Lao People's Democratic Republic	23 January 1964	Admitted as the Kingdom of Laos
(Latvia)	Latvia	3 December 1991	Member as Latvia 1921–1940, as part of the Soviet Union 1954–1991, readmitted in 1991. Further information: member removals
(Lebanon)	Lebanon	23 December 1948	
(Lesotho)	Lesotho	2 June 1980	Previously a member from 1966 to 1971, admitted 1980. Further information: member withdrawals
(Liberia)	Liberia +	28 June 1919	
(Libya)	Libya	11 June 1952	
(Lithuania)	Lithuania	4 October 1991	Member as Lithuania 1921–1940, as part of the Soviet Union 1954–1991, readmitted as Lithuania in 1991. Further information: member removals
(Luxembourg)	Luxembourg	16 December 1920	
(Madagascar)	Madagascar	1 November 1960	
(Malawi)	Malawi	22 March 1965	
(Malaysia)	Malaysia	11 November 1957	
(Maldives)	Maldives	15 May 2009	
(Mali)	Mali	22 September 1960	
(Malta)	Malta	4 January 1965	
(Marshall Islands)	Marshall Islands	3 July 2007	
(Mauritania)	Mauritania	20 June 1961	
(Mauritius)	Mauritius	5 May 1969	
(Mexico)	Mexico	12 September 1931	
(Mongolia)	Mongolia	24 May 1968	
(Montenegro)	Montenegro	14 July 2006	Prior participation as part of Yugoslavia
(Morocco)	Morocco	13 June 1956	
(Mozambique)	Mozambique	28 May 1976	
(Myanmar)	Myanmar	18 May 1948	
(Namibia)	Namibia	3 October 1978	
(Nepal)	Nepal	30 August 1966	
(Kingdom of the Netherlands)	Netherlands *	28 June 1919	
(New Zealand)	New Zealand +	28 June 1919	
(Nicaragua)	Nicaragua +	9 April 1957	Previously a member from 1919 to 1938, admitted 1957. Further information: member withdrawals
(Niger)	Niger	27 February 1961	
(Nigeria)	Nigeria	17 October 1960	
(North Macedonia)	North Macedonia	28 May 1993	Prior participation as part of Yugoslavia
(Norway)	Norway *	28 June 1919	
(Oman)	Oman	31 January 1994	
(Pakistan)	Pakistan	31 October 1947	
(Palau)	Palau	29 May 2012	
(Panama)	Panama +	28 June 1919	
(Papua New Guinea)	Papua New Guinea	1 May 1976	
(Paraguay)	Paraguay *	5 September 1956	Previously a member from 1919 to 1937, admitted 1956. Further information: member withdrawals
(Peru)	Peru +	28 June 1919	
(Philippines)	Philippines	15 June 1948	
(Poland)	Poland +	28 June 1919	Submitted notification of intention to withdraw on 17 November 1984, extended that intention in November 1986 without withdrawing, and rescinded the intention to withdraw on 17 November 1987. Further information: incomplete member withdrawals
(Portugal)	Portugal +	28 June 1919	
(Qatar)	Qatar	25 April 1972	
(South Korea)	Republic of Korea	9 December 1991	
(Moldova)	Republic of Moldova	8 June 1992	Prior participation as part of the Soviet Union
(Romania)	Romania +	11 May 1956	Previously a member from 1919 to 1942, admitted 1956. Further information: member withdrawals
(Russia)	Russian Federation	26 April 1954	Admitted to membership as the Soviet Union from 1934 to 1940, admitted 1954. Further information: member withdrawals Following the dissolution of the Soviet Union, the Russian Federation was confirmed as the successor state for the purposes of membership.
(Rwanda)	Rwanda	18 September 1962	
(Saint Kitts and Nevis)	St. Kitts and Nevis	19 May 1996	
(Saint Lucia)	St. Lucia	9 April 1980	
(Saint Vincent and the Grenadines)	St. Vincent and the Grenadines	31 May 1995	
(Samoa)	Samoa	7 May 2005	
(San Marino)	San Marino	18 June 1982	
(São Tomé and Príncipe)	São Tomé and Príncipe	1 June 1982	
(Saudi Arabia)	Saudi Arabia	12 January 1976	
(Senegal)	Senegal	4 November 1960	
(Serbia)	Serbia	24 November 2000	Prior participation as part of Yugoslavia (1919–1992), admitted in 2000 as Federal Republic of Yugoslavia.
(Seychelles)	Seychelles	25 April 1977	
(Sierra Leone)	Sierra Leone	13 June 1961	
(Singapore)	Singapore	25 October 1965	
(Slovakia)	Slovakia	22 January 1993	Prior participation as part of Czechoslovakia
(Slovenia)	Slovenia	29 May 1992	Prior participation as part of Yugoslavia
(Solomon Islands)	Solomon Islands	28 May 1984	
(Somalia)	Somalia	18 November 1960	
(South Africa)	South Africa +	26 May 1994	Previously a member from 1919 to 1966, admitted in 1994. Further information: member withdrawals
(South Sudan)	South Sudan	29 April 2012	
(Spain)	Spain *	28 May 1956	Previously a member from 1919 to 1941, admitted 1956. Further information: member withdrawals
(Sri Lanka)	Sri Lanka	28 June 1948	
(Sudan)	Sudan	12 June 1956	Sudan's membership in the ILO preceded membership in the United Nations (12 November 1956), which was possible following a vote of unanimous support (with no abstentions) at the 1956 International Labour Conference.
(Suriname)	Suriname	24 February 1976	
(Sweden)	Sweden *	28 June 1919	
(Switzerland)	Switzerland *	28 June 1919	
Syrian revolution	Syrian Arab Republic	4 December 1947	
(Tajikistan)	Tajikistan	26 November 1993	Prior participation as part of the Soviet Union
(Thailand)	Thailand +	28 June 1919	Admitted as Siam
(Timor-Leste)	Timor-Leste	19 August 2003	
(Togo)	Togo	7 June 1960	
(Tonga)	Tonga	24 February 2016	
(Trinidad and Tobago)	Trinidad and Tobago	24 May 1963	
(Tunisia)	Tunisia	12 June 1956	
(Turkey)	Turkey	18 July 1932	
(Turkmenistan)	Turkmenistan	24 September 1993	Prior participation as part of the Soviet Union
(Tuvalu)	Tuvalu	27 May 2008	
(Uganda)	Uganda	25 March 1963	
(Ukraine)	Ukraine	12 May 1954	Admitted as the Ukrainian Soviet Socialist Republic. Further information: former non-sovereign state members
(United Arab Emirates)	United Arab Emirates	25 April 1972	
(United Kingdom)	United Kingdom of Great Britain and Northern Ireland +	28 June 1919	
(Tanzania)	United Republic of Tanzania	30 January 1962	
(United States)	United States of America	18 February 1980	Joined in 1934 without being a member of the League of Nations, withdrew in 1977, admitted 1980. Further information: member withdrawals
(Uruguay)	Uruguay +	28 June 1919	
(Uzbekistan)	Uzbekistan	13 July 1992	Prior participation as part of the Soviet Union
(Vanuatu)	Vanuatu	22 May 2003	
(Venezuela)	Venezuela (Bolivarian Republic of) *	16 March 1958	Previously a member from 1919 to 1957, admitted 1958. Further information: member withdrawals
(Vietnam)	Viet Nam	20 May 1992	Admitted as a member as the Republic of Vietnam from 1950 to 1976. Following the incorporation of the Republic of Vietnam into the Socialist Republic of Vietnam in July 1976, the country ceased to be a member. Readmitted in 1980, withdrew in 1985 and readmitted 1992. Further information: member withdrawals
(Yemen)	Yemen	20 May 1965	
(Zambia)	Zambia	2 December 1964	
(Zimbabwe)	Zimbabwe	6 June 1980	

A "+" and a blue background indicates a founding member; an "_{*}" and a khaki background indicates states invited to be founding members.

== Observer states ==
United Nations non-member observer states and the International Labour Organisation
Flag	State	Notes
(Palestine)	State of Palestine	United Nations General Assembly resolution 67/19 accorded non-member observer status to the state of Palestine, which gives the right of participation in the General Assembly and the other organs of the United Nations. The ILO conducts a technical cooperation programme and other initiatives in Palestine. In June 2025, Palestine was promoted from its "obsolete" liberation movement status to non-member state observer status.

== Member withdrawals ==
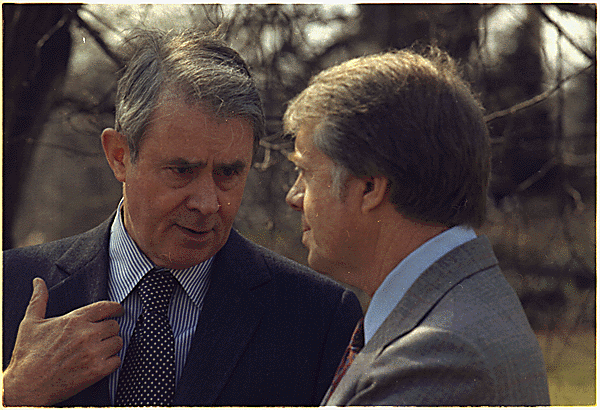
President Jimmy Carter (at right) affirmed the departure of the US from the ILO on 1 November 1977, despite recommendations of a one-year delay from Secretary of State Cyrus Vance (at left) and National Security Advisor Zbigniew Brzezinski.

According to the ILO's constitution, a member state may withdraw only after giving two years' notice and settling all outstanding financial dues; following withdrawal, a former member state is still obliged to comply with the ILO conventions the country has ratified.

Readmission of a former member state that has remained a UN member requires formal communication to the ILO Director-General of acceptance of the obligations of the ILO constitution. A former member state that is not a UN member can be approved for readmission only by a decision of the International Labour Conference.

Since 1927, 19 member states have withdrawn from the ILO; all subsequently rejoined.

Member states that have withdrawn from the International Labour Organization
Flag	State	Date of withdrawal	Date of admission	Notes
(Albania)	Albania	5 August 1967	22 May 1991	In 1965, Albania gave notification of withdrawal from the ILO, citing the organization's lack of support to anti-colonial liberation movements and exclusion of communist countries. Following the end of the Cold War, Albania was admitted.
(Costa Rica)	Costa Rica	1 January 1927	21 April 1944	In December 1924, Costa Rica gave notice of withdrawal from the League of Nations due to perceived ill-treatment for overdue membership contributions and dissatisfaction with the League's lack of action against the United States for pursuing the Monroe Doctrine. Withdrawal from the League precipitated Costa Rica's withdrawal from the ILO. Starting in 1942, engagement with the ILO led to admission in 1944.
(El Salvador)	El Salvador	1939	21 June 1948	In 1937, the government gave notice of withdrawal from the League of Nations and the ILO. The official reason given related to financial priorities, but there was also a lack of active participation by El Salvador in Geneva. Furthermore, from the mid-1930 El Salvador was more focussed on continental (Inter-American) affairs and the consequences of the failure of the League of Nations to adequately manage the Abyssinia Crisis also influenced the government's decision. Following the Second World War, El Salvador reestablished relations with the ILO and was admitted in June 1948.
(Germany)	Germany	21 October 1935	12 June 1951	The passage of the Enabling Act of 1933 effectively gave the Nazi Party complete control of the German state, whereupon repression of political enemies occurred; this included trade unions, whose assets were confiscated and whose members were transferred to the Nazi-controlled German Labour Front (DAF). At the 1933 International Labour Conference the credentials of the DAF as a legitimate (independent) workers' organization were rejected and during the Conference itself, criticisms were leveled at the Nazi government's suppression of trade unions and support for antisemitism. Following the Conference, Germany gave notice of intent to withdraw from the ILO, which came into effect in 1935. After the Second World War, the Federal Republic of Germany (West Germany at the time) was admitted in 1951. The German Democratic Republic (East Germany) was admitted as a separate state from 1 January 1974.
(Guatemala)	Guatemala	26 May 1938	19 October 1945	During the 1930s, the government increasingly focussed on continental (i.e. Inter-American) affairs which were regarded ultimately as incompatible with the League of Nations, giving notice to withdraw from the League and the ILO in May 1936. Following the Second World War, on 14 September 1945, Guillermo Toriello, Minister for External Affairs, requested admission to the ILO, which was completed the following month.
(Italy)	Italy	December 1939	19 October 1945	Following the Abyssinia Crisis in 1935, where Fascist Italy ultimately annexed Ethiopia to create Italian East Africa, the government became increasingly dissatisfied with the League of Nations and on 11 December 1937, Prime Minister Benito Mussolini, in a national address, announced Italy's withdrawal from the League of Nations. On 16 December 1937, the ILO received notification from Galeazzo Ciano, Minister of Foreign Affairs, of Italy's intention to withdraw. The fall of the fascist regime led to the reestablishment of relations with the ILO in 1944, an agreement in May 1945 to appoint an ILO representative in Rome and the country's admission in October of that year.
(Honduras)	Honduras	10 July 1938	1 January 1955	Close to the position of Guatemala favouring Inter-American approaches, Honduras gave notification of withdrawal from the League of Nations in July 1936 and did not indicate any intention to remain in the ILO. In January 1955 Honduras was admitted.
(Japan)	Japan	November 1940	26 November 1951	Starting with the Mukden Incident, Japan came under increasing criticism and condemnation in the League of Nations, eventually leading to withdrawal from the League in 1933. Although maintaining ILO membership, contradictions between government policy, a reversal of positive attitudes of the employers and the broader international deterioration of inter-state relations led to Japan giving notice of withdrawal in November 1938. Following the Second World War, in March 1948 an ILO Committee in Japan was established and in 1951 the country was admitted.
(Lesotho)	Lesotho	15 July 1971	2 June 1980	Between 1971 and 1980, Lesotho withdrew from the ILO due to an inability to meet the financial obligations of membership.
(Nicaragua)	Nicaragua	26 June 1938	9 April 1957	Close to the position of Guatemala favouring Inter-American approaches, Nicaragua gave notice of withdrawal from the League of Nations in June 1936 and confirmed withdrawal from the ILO in June 1938. In April 1957, Nicaragua was admitted.
(Paraguay)	Paraguay	23 February 1937	5 September 1956	Following dissatisfaction with decisions of the League of Nations related to the Chaco War, Paraguay announced withdrawal from the League and the ILO in February 1935. In September 1956, Paraguay was admitted to the ILO.
(Romania)	Romania	10 July 1942	11 May 1956	Romania gave notification of withdrawal from the League of Nations in July 1940 and did not indicate any intention to remain in the ILO. In May 1956, Romania was admitted to the ILO.
(Spain)	Spain	8 May 1941	28 May 1956	Spain gave notification of withdrawal from the League of Nations in May 1939 and did not indicate any intention to remain in the ILO. In May 1956, Spain was admitted to the ILO.
(Soviet Union)	Soviet Union	February 1940	26 April 1954	The Soviet Union was expelled from the League of Nations in December 1939 following the start of the Winter War. However, this expulsion did not automatically invalidate membership in the ILO; not until the meeting of the ILO Administrative Council in February the following year was the membership rescinded. While the death of leader Joseph Stalin played a direct role in the reorientation of Soviet policy, an inability to successfully influence UN affairs and a desire to have broader contacts with the non-communist world, saw the USSR take up membership in the ILO in April 1954.
(South Africa)	South Africa	11 March 1966	26 May 1994	In March 1964, the South African foreign minister notified the ILO of the country's withdrawal. From the late 1950s, the country's policy of institutionalized racial discrimination, officially known as Apartheid, had come under frequent condemnation; rather than be formally excluded from the ILO by a vote of the constituents, South Africa chose to withdraw. Following the end of Apartheid and the conclusion of multi-racial elections, South Africa joined the ILO in 1994.
(United States)	United States of America	6 November 1977	18 February 1980	Although US employers and trade unions had long expressed dissatisfaction with the ILO due to the admission of the Soviet Union in 1954, official United States government withdrawal was triggered by reactions to three issues in the 1970s: the role of the Soviet Union, policy towards Israel/Palestine and organizational processes. In July 1970, the appointment of the Soviet diplomat Pavel Astapenko as ILO Assistant Director-General led to the US cancelling part of its membership payments, following lobbying of the US Congress by George Meany, AFL-CIO President, who considered the ILO to be overly influenced by the Soviet Union. The adoption by the 1974 International Labour Conference of a resolution condemning "Israeli authorities" for "discrimination, racism and violation of trade union freedoms and rights" in Palestine, (Note: "Adopted on 20 June 1974 by 224 votes in favour, 0 against, with 122 abstentions") despite the ILO having conducted no previous investigations of matter, was strongly opposed by US representatives and the granting of observer status to the Palestine Liberation Organization (PLO) at the 1975 Conference, (Note: The vote on 12 June 1975 was 246 in favour, 35 against and 66 abstentions.) led the US employer, government and trade union representatives to boycott the Conference's remaining sessions. The combination of these saw the US Government give notice of an intention to withdraw in November 1975. Secretary of State Henry Kissinger indicated that the US would not follow through with withdrawal if there were improvements in US areas of concern. However, in the two years following, decisions at the ILO went against US wishes, in particular, the 1977 Conference decision which, due to a lack of quorum, failed to adopt the recommendations of the Committee of Experts (which detailed the failure to observe ILO standards in Argentina, Bolivia, Chad, Chile, Czechoslovakia, Ethiopia, Liberia and the USSR). In November 1977, President Jimmy Carter affirmed the decision of the Ford administration to withdraw from the ILO, despite advice from Secretary of State Cyrus Vance and National Security Advisor Zbigniew Brzezinski to suspend withdrawal for a year, and appeals to remain from nine West European countries, Japan and the Pope. In the years immediately following departure, changes in ILO procedures, including the introduction of secret balloting, the requirement for due process investigations prior to the adoption of resolutions and the opening of investigations into the violation of trade union rights in the Soviet Union and Poland, led to a re-evaluation, with President Carter affirming ILO membership on 18 February 1980.
(Venezuela)	Venezuela	3 May 1957	15 March 1958	In April 1955, the Venezuelan government expelled a Dutch worker delegate of the ILO Governing Body who voiced criticisms of freedom of association rights in the country during a meeting of the ILO's Petroleum Committee in Caracas. Officers of the Governing Body subsequently adjourned the meeting, to which the Venezuelan government immediately objected and shortly after notified their intention to withdraw from the ILO. On 15 March 1958, Venezuela formally accepted the obligations of membership and was admitted.
(Vietnam)	Vietnam	1 June 1985	20 May 1992	In June 1983, Vietnam gave notification of an intention to withdraw temporarily. The reasons included an inability to pay the assessed membership fees due to extreme financial constraints, a lack of technical support and dissatisfaction with ILO investigations into claims of Vietnamese workers being subject to forced labour in the Soviet Union. The withdrawal went into effect in 1985; Vietnam was admitted in 1992.
(Socialist Federal Republic of Yugoslavia)	Yugoslavia	16 June 1949	16 May 1951	In 1947, with the emergence of the Cold War, Yugoslavia gave notice of withdrawal, citing incompatibility between the structures of the ILO and the country's ongoing socialist development. The withdrawal came into effect in 1949, however, Yugoslavia was admitted in 1951.

== Incomplete member withdrawals ==
Two member states have officially communicated an intention to withdraw, but prior to the ILO declaring their membership to have lapsed, subsequently communicated an intention to remain.

Member states which did not complete withdrawal from the International Labour Organization
Flag	State	Date intention to withdraw received	Date intention to withdraw rescinded	Notes
(Indonesia)	Indonesia	25 March 1965	6 September 1966	During the period of Konfrontasi, Indonesia, under President Sukarno, came into conflict with Malaysia, Britain and the United States following Malaysia obtaining a seat in the Security Council and in January 1965, withdrawal from the United Nations was announced. In March, the government communicated an intention to withdraw from the ILO, which would have taken effect on 25 March 1967. Following the transition to the New Order, the government under President Suharto, indicated in 1966 that Indonesia no longer wished to withdraw. The ILO considered that there had been no interruption to Indonesia's membership.
(Poland)	Poland	17 November 1984	17 November 1987	Following the imposition of martial law and the suppression of the independent trade union Solidarność in December 1981, the ILO governing body in May 1983 voted to constitute a commission of inquiry, the highest action which can be taken against a member state under the organization's constitution. The day after the commission's report was submitted to the ILO Governing body, which was heavily critical of the detention of trade unionists and the denial of trade union independence, Poland communicated an intention to withdraw on 17 November 1984. Poland extended that intention in November 1986 without officially withdrawing, however, with the subsequent thawing of the political situation, Poland rescinded the intention to withdraw on 17 November 1987.

== States removed from membership ==
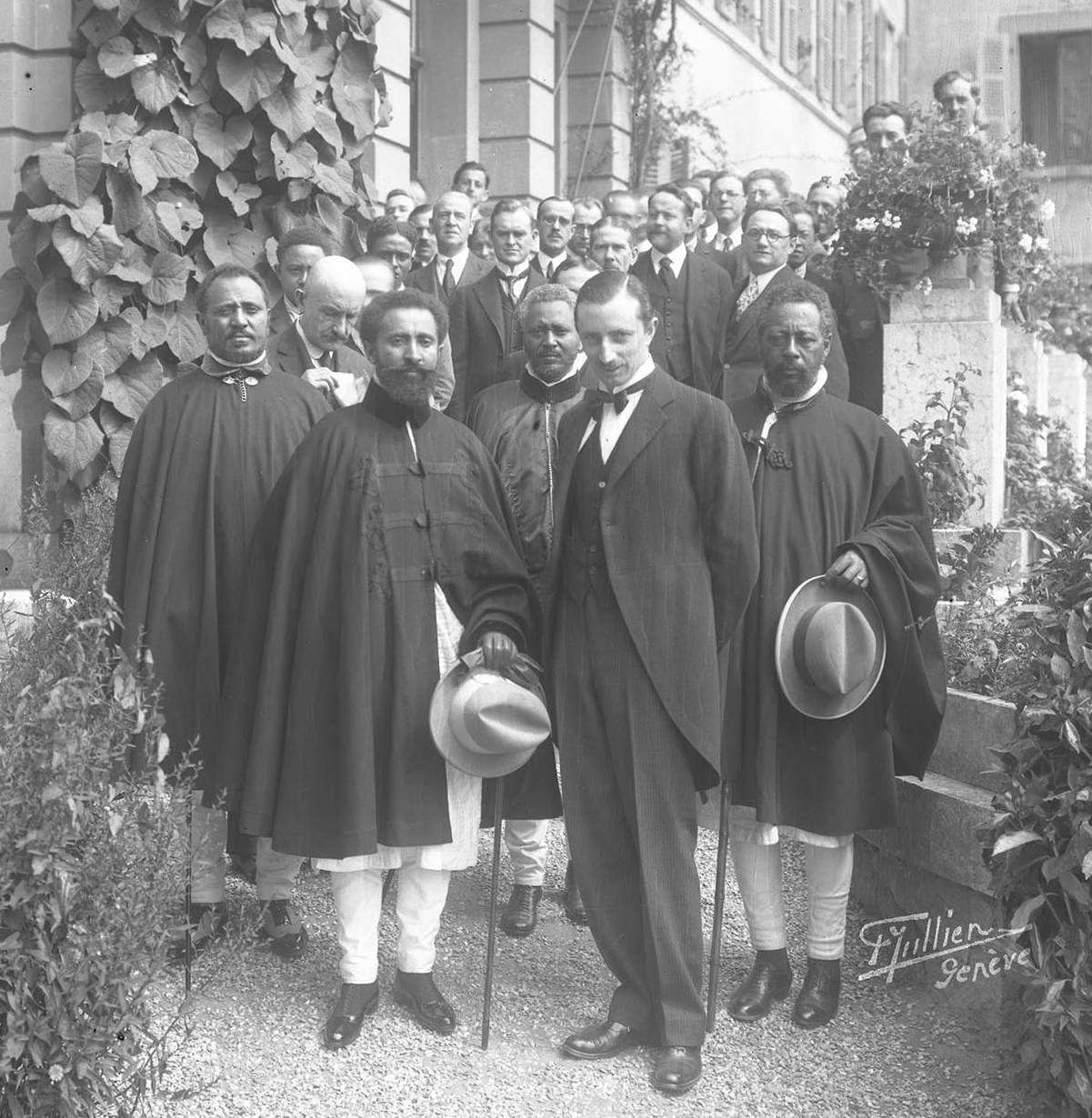
Visit of Haile Selaisse of Ethiopia to the ILO, August 1924

Due to circumstances related to annexation, five states have been removed from ILO membership; all were later readmitted.

States removed from membership of the International Labour Organization
Flag	State	Date of removal	Date of readmission	Notes
	Austria	13 March 1938	24 June 1947	Following the Anschluss on 12 March 1938, Austria was removed from membership of the ILO. In July 1947 the International Labour Conference confirmed Austria's readmission to the ILO.
(Ethiopia)	Ethiopia	1939	1943	Following the annexation of Ethiopia by Italy, the country was removed from the membership list of the ILO between 1939 and 1942, however, the country is still considered to have held membership since first joining on 28 September 1923.
(Estonia)	Estonia	1946	13 January 1992	In August 1940 the Baltic states were occupied and subsequently annexed as new republics of the Soviet Union. This action effectively terminated the Baltic states' membership, with the ILO considering this termination "definitive" in 1946. Following the declarations of independence by the Baltic states in the northern spring of 1990, the ILO indicated that an admission process was required, although this was acknowledged as readmission.
(Latvia)	Latvia	1946	3 December 1991	In August 1940 the Baltic states were occupied and subsequently annexed as new republics of the Soviet Union. This action effectively terminated the Baltic states' membership, with the ILO considering this termination "definitive" in 1946. Following the declarations of independence by the Baltic states in the northern spring of 1990, the ILO indicated that an admission process was required, although this was acknowledged as readmission.
(Lithuania)	Lithuania	1946	4 October 1991	In August 1940 the Baltic states were occupied and subsequently annexed as new republics of the Soviet Union. This action effectively terminated the Baltic states' membership, with the ILO considering this termination "definitive" in 1946. Following the declarations of independence by the Baltic states in the northern spring of 1990, the ILO indicated that an admission process was required, although this was acknowledged as readmission.

== Former non-sovereign state members ==
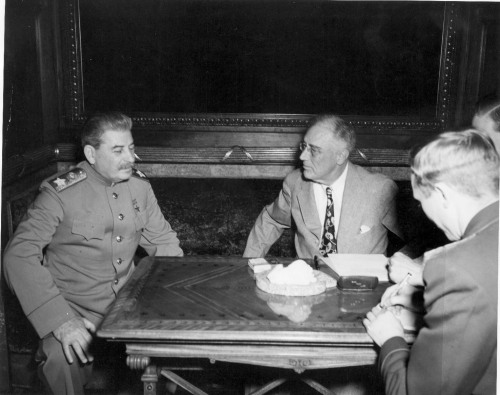
Joseph Stalin (left) and Franklin D. Roosevelt (right), Yalta, February 1945

The ILO constitution indicates that members must be states (initially, although not exclusively, (Note: The United States was a member of the ILO from 1934, but never joined the League of Nations.) members of the League of Nations or, after 1945, members of the United Nations), which has been interpreted to imply those entities with state sovereignty. The basis for this was the 26 August 1930 ruling of the Permanent Court of International Justice which determined that Danzig, whose external relations were under Poland's control, was inadmissible to the ILO. Despite this ruling, three non-sovereign states, prior to achieving sovereign status, were, due to political circumstances, admitted as members of the ILO.

Former non-sovereign state members of the International Labour Organization
Flag	State	Period of non-sovereign state status	Notes
(Byelorussian Soviet Socialist Republic)	Byelorussian Soviet Socialist Republic	28 April 1954 – 25 December 1991	During the Yalta Conference in February 1945, Soviet Premier Joseph Stalin and US President Franklin D. Roosevelt agreed that the US and the USSR would each be entitled to two extra seats in the soon to be established United Nations. The USSR nominated the Byelorussian SSR and the Ukrainian SSR to the UN, which resulted in these two non-sovereign state entities achieving ILO membership. The USA never exercised the option for extra seats at the UN. With the dissolution of the Soviet Union, Belarus and Ukraine became the successor states for the purposes of membership.
(Ukrainian Soviet Socialist Republic)	Ukrainian Soviet Socialist Republic	12 May 1954 – 25 December 1991	
(United Nations)	Namibia	3 October 1978 – 21 March 1990	Namibia was admitted as the 136th full member in 1978 following a request from the United Nations Council for Namibia despite not being an independent state at the time.

== Former members ==
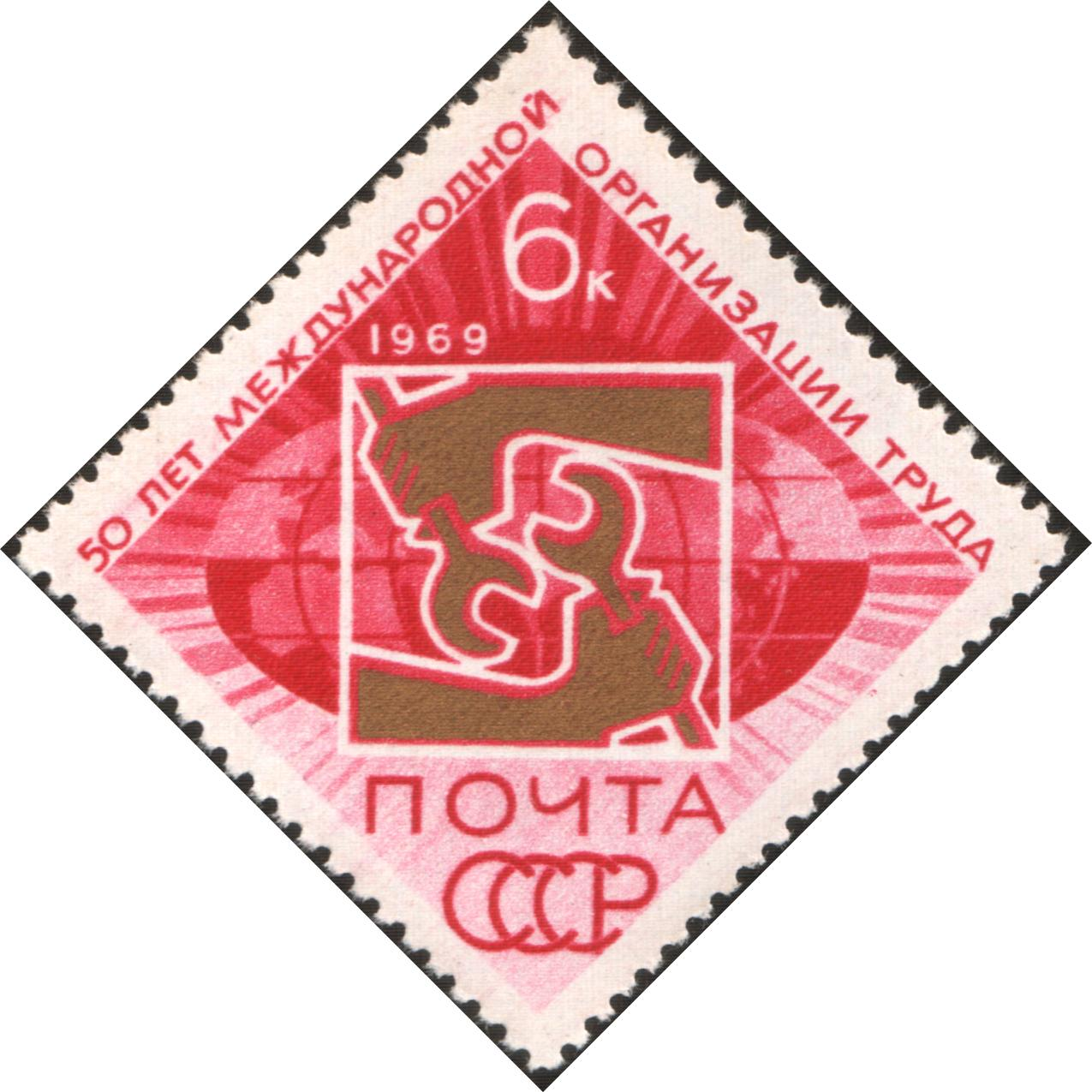
Stamp issued by the Soviet Union commemorating the 50th anniversary of the founding of the ILO

A "+" and blue background indicates an ILO founding member.

Former member states of the International Labour Organization
Flag	State	Date of admission	Date membership ceased	Notes
(Czechoslovakia)	Czechoslovakia +	28 June 1919	31 December 1992	Following the dissolution of Czechoslovakia, the country ceased to be a member. Neither the Czech Republic nor Slovakia were considered to be a successor state for the purposes of membership and both were required to be admitted as new members.
(East Germany)	German Democratic Republic	1 January 1974	3 October 1990	Following the reunification of Germany, the GDR ceased to be a member.
(South Yemen)	People's Democratic Republic of Yemen	1969	22 May 1990	Following the unification of Yemen, the PDRY ceased to be a member.
(South Vietnam)	Republic of Vietnam	1950	July 1976	Ceased to be a member following incorporation into the Socialist Republic of Vietnam.
(Soviet Union)	Soviet Union	18 September 1934	February 1940	Following the dissolution of the Soviet Union, membership passed to the Russian Federation as the successor state.
(Soviet Union)	Soviet Union	26 April 1954	25 December 1991	Following the dissolution of the Soviet Union, membership passed to the Russian Federation as the successor state.
(Socialist Federal Republic of Yugoslavia)	Yugoslavia +	28 June 1919	27 April 1992	Admitted as the State of Slovenes, Croats and Serbs. Following the dissolution of Socialist Federal Republic of Yugoslavia, the country ceased to be a member.

== UN member states not members of the ILO ==
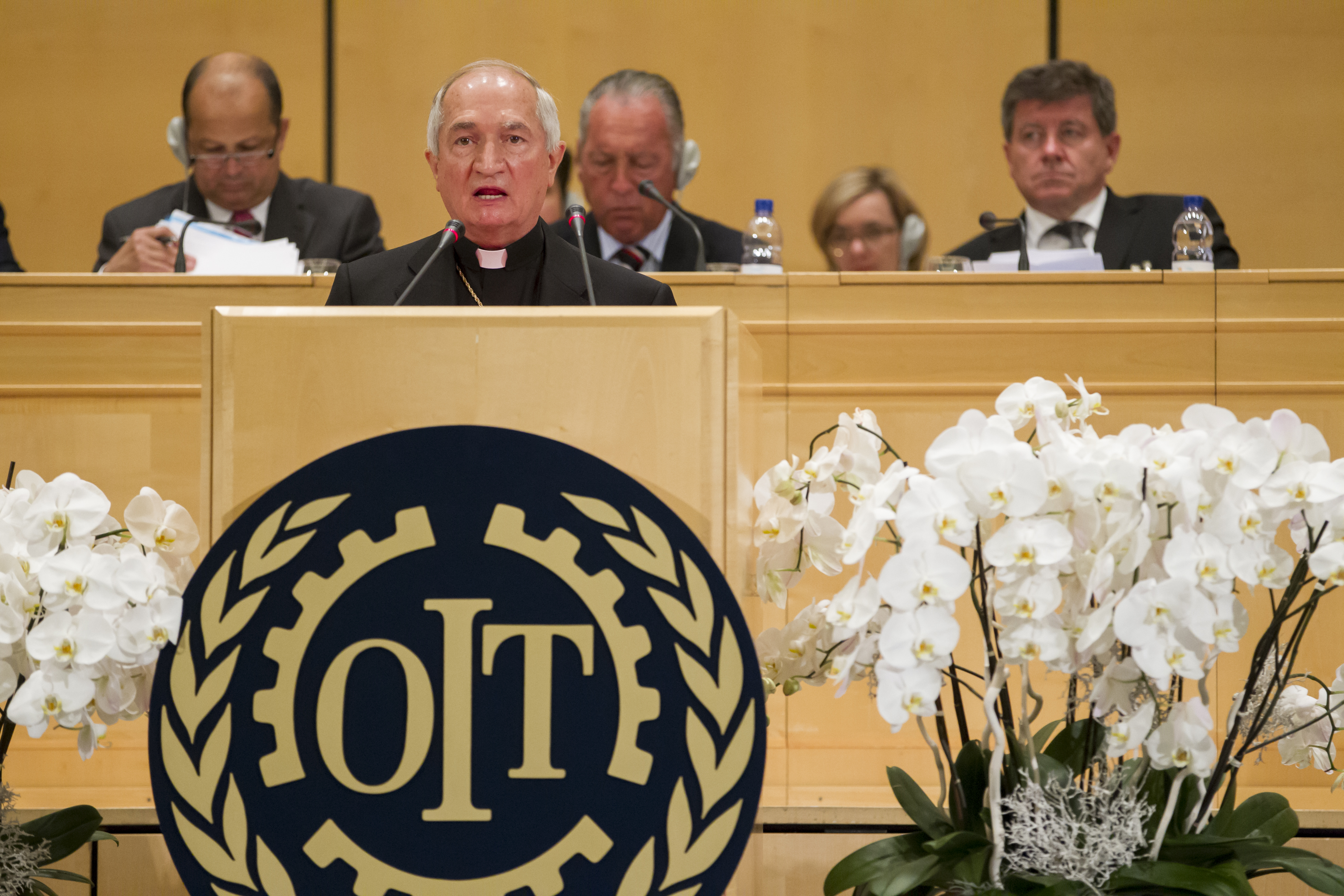
Silvano Maria Tomasi, Apostolic Nuncio, speaking to the International Labour Conference, June 2014. ILO Director-General, Guy Ryder, is seated at right.

United Nations member states not members of the International Labour Organization
Flag	State	Notes
(Andorra)	Andorra	In 2002, the Committee on the Rights of the Child sought clarification on Andorra's non-membership in the ILO. The December 2020 report of the Working Group on the Universal Periodic Review of the UN Human Rights Council recommended that Andorra join the ILO; in response the government indicated that it would consider the recommendation.
(Bhutan)	Bhutan	In August 2020, Labour Minister Ugyen Dorji indicated that although discussions had taken place for more than a decade, there was no plan to join the ILO.
(North Korea)	Democratic People’s Republic of Korea	The June 2019 report of the Working Group on the Universal Periodic Review of the UN Human Rights Council recommended that DPRK join the ILO; in response, the government noted the recommendation.
(Liechtenstein)	Liechtenstein	In 2018, Liechtenstein indicated that in the future it did not intend to become a member of the ILO, claiming the country's labour standards exceeded the stipulations of ILO instruments.
(Federated States of Micronesia)	Micronesia	The March 2021 report of the Working Group on the Universal Periodic Review of the UN Human Rights Council recommended that Micronesia join the ILO.
(Monaco)	Monaco	The December 2018 report of the Working Group on the Universal Periodic Review of the UN Human Rights Council recommended that Monaco join the ILO; the government stated that discussions remained ongoing since the last review in 2014 and that ILO's standards on trade union rights and Monaco's policy of priority employment for locals remained of concern.
(Nauru)	Nauru	In 2011, the government of Nauru advised the United Nations Human Rights Council there was no intention to become party to the Conventions of the ILO.

== UN non-member observer states and the ILO ==
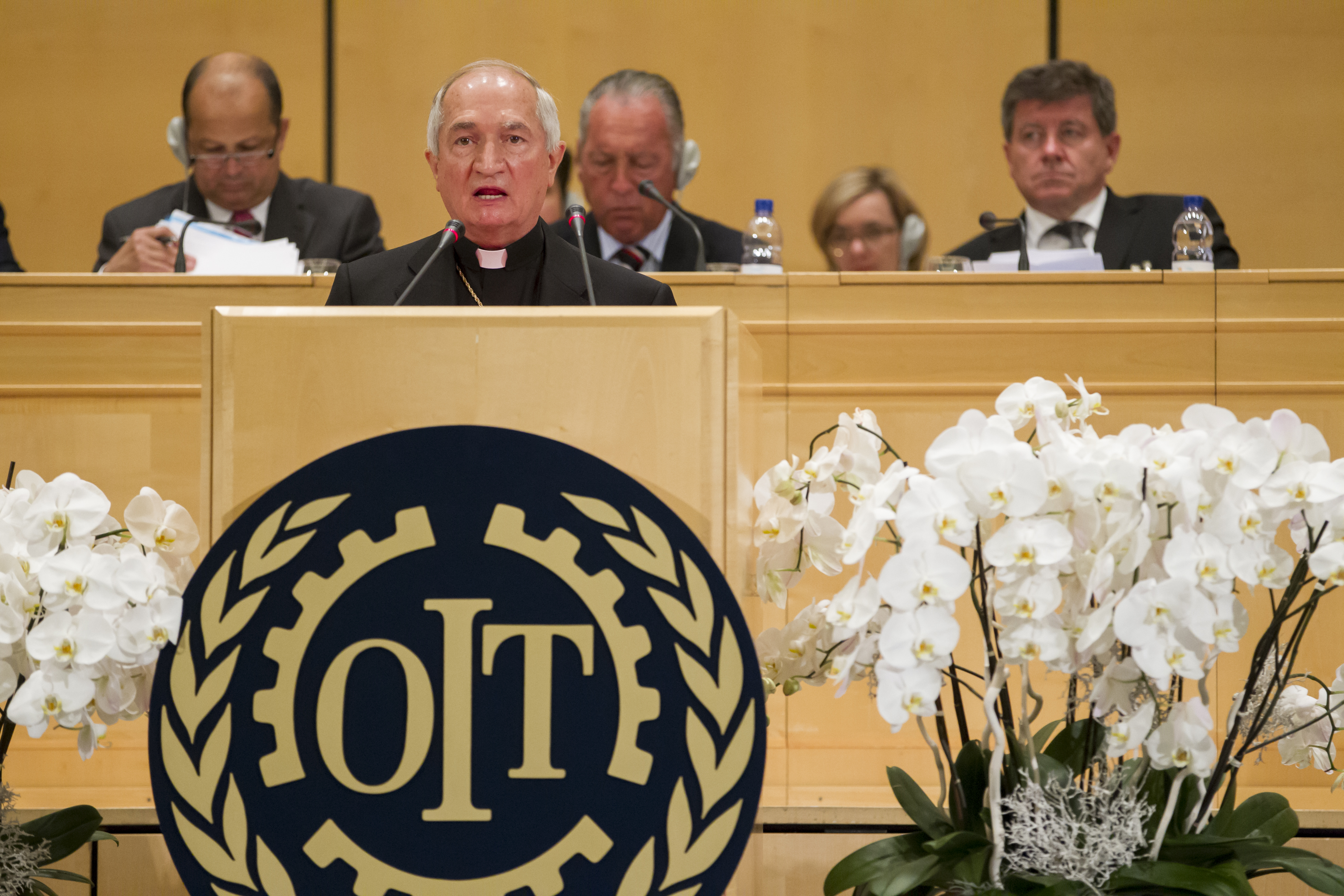
Silvano Maria Tomasi, Apostolic Nuncio, speaking to the International Labour Conference, June 2014. ILO Director-General, Guy Ryder, is seated at right.

United Nations non-member observer states and the International Labour Organisation
Flag	State	Notes
(Vatican City)	Holy See	Based on an unofficial agreement reached in 1926, the Vatican nominates a special advisor to the ILO Director-General on social and religious matters.
(Palestine)	State of Palestine	United Nations General Assembly resolution 67/19 of 2012 accorded non-member observer status to the state of Palestine, which gives the right of participation in the General Assembly and the other organs of the United Nations. The ILO conducts a technical cooperation programme and other initiatives in Palestine.

== See also ==
- List of specialized agencies of the United Nations
- Member states of the United Nations
