= 2015 Togolese presidential election =

- 25 April 2015
- Registered: 3,509,258
- Turnout: 60.89% (▼4.79pp)
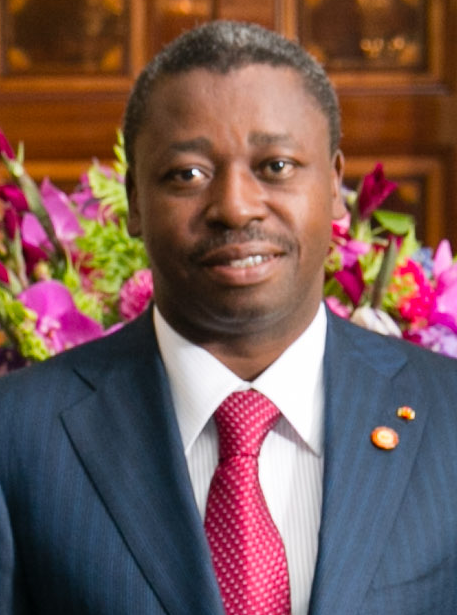

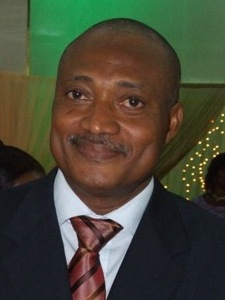
Nominee	Faure Gnassingbé	Jean-Pierre Fabre
Party	UNIR	ANC
Popular vote	1,221,282	731,230
Percentage	58.77%	35.19%
President before election
Faure Gnassingbé
UNIR
Elected President
Faure Gnassingbé
UNIR

Presidential elections were held in Togo on 25 April 2015. Initially scheduled for 15 April 2015, the election was postponed by ten days at the recommendation of John Dramani Mahama, President of Ghana and acting chair of the ECOWAS organization. Incumbent President Faure Gnassingbé was seeking a third term and was opposed by four other candidates, including the main opposition leader Jean-Pierre Fabre of the National Alliance for Change. Provisional results by the National Independent Election Commission declared Gnassingbé the winner with about 59% of the vote, whilst Fabre received 35%. Fabre called the results a "crime against national sovereignty", saying he considered himself the new president.

== Conduct ==
The United Nations, African Union, ECOWAS and the National Consultation of Civil Society (a Togolese NGO funded by the European Union) felt the elections were free and transparent.

== Results ==
On the evening of 28 April 2015 Issifou Tabiou Taffa, the head of the Election Commission (CENI), appeared on National Television (TVT) to proclaim the provisional results. As he started answering introductory questions from the anchor, Pedro Amunzu, a member of the ANC and vice president of CENI, attempted to disrupt the process. The producer quickly swapped the scene with a different anchor. About an hour later, Tabiou reappeared, proclaiming Gnassingbé the winner with 58.75% of the vote, his main opponent Fabre picking up 34.95%. On 29 April, Fabre rejected the official result.

On 1 May 2015 Patrick Lawson-Banku, Fabre's communication director, released a statement to the press in which he claimed Fabre had received 641,765 votes to 539,764 for Gnassingbé or 52.20% to 43.90%. These results, according to Lawson, accounted for about 60% of polling centers and 63% of registered voters. The remaining 40% of polling centers were from 16 prefectures located largely in the northern part of the country, considered the incumbent's stronghold. Fabre's party claimed the results from those 16 prefectures (Bassar, Bimah (prefecture), Blitta, Cinkassé, Kpendjal, Tône, Tandjouaré, Keran, Dankpen, Oti, Sotouboua, Tchamba, Yoto, Wawa, Amou, Kozah) were fraudulent and ought to be invalidated.

Candidate	Party	Votes	%
Faure Gnassingbé	Union for the Republic	1,221,282	58.77
Jean-Pierre Fabre	National Alliance for Change	731,230	35.19
Tchaboure Gogue	Alliance of Democrats for Integral Development	83,768	4.03
Komandega Tamaa	New Togolese Commitment	21,569	1.04
Mohamed Tchassona-Traoré	Citizens' Movement for Democracy and Development	20,048	0.96
Total		2,077,897	100.00
Valid votes		2,077,897	97.25
Invalid/blank votes		58,813	2.75
Total votes		2,136,710	100.00
Registered voters/turnout		3,509,258	60.89
Source: Constitutional Court

== Aftermath ==
On 3 May the Constitutional Court validated the official results produced by CENI and proclaimed Gnassingbé president for the next five years. Fabre refused to file appeals to the Court, arguing that the institution was subservient to the ruling party. Gnassingbé was sworn in for his third term on 4 May 2015.
