= 2008 in Togo =

- Decades: 1980s; 1990s; 2000s; 2010s; 2020s
- See also: Other events of 2008; History of Togo

Events of the year 2008 in Togo

== Incumbents ==
- President: Faure Gnassingbé
- Prime Ministers: Komlan Mally (until September 8), Gilbert Houngbo (after September 8)

== Events ==
- March 13: Government announces plans to upgrade Lomé–Tokoin International Airport
- June 13: Muammar Gaddafi, then-Head of State of Libya, begins 3-day visit to Togo
- November 10: International Association of Doctors for the Promotion of Education and Health in Africa begins campaign to provide disadvantaged populations with free healthcare
- December 22: Government announces pledge of 300 million CFA francs to rebuild stadium in Sokodé

== Establishments ==
- Asky Airlines (June)
- Organisation to Build a United Togo
- Togolese Hockey Federation (May 25)
