= 2007 in Togo =

- Decades: 1980s; 1990s; 2000s; 2010s; 2020s
- See also: Other events of 2007; History of Togo

Events of the year 2007 in Togo

== Incumbents ==
- President: Faure Gnassingbé
- Prime Ministers: Yawovi Agboyibo (until December 6), Komlan Mally (after December 6)

== Events ==
- February 2: Citizens' Movement for Democracy and Development established
- June 3: Togolese football fans riding in helicopter crash near Lungi Airport
- June 8: Denis Komivi Amuzu-Dzakpah is ordained Archbishop of Lomé
- August 4: Opposition party protests against government to denounce "impunity"
- September 15: Widescale flooding occurs in Kpendjal Prefecture
- October 14: 2007 Togolese parliamentary election
- September 20: Government of Togo increases campaign for vaccination against Yellow fever
- November 29: Following new legislative elections in Togo, European Union announces lifting of sanctions imposed on country in 1993
- December 6: Radio France Internationale launches third FM relay in Togo

== Deaths ==
- December 3: Angèle Patassé, former First Lady of Togo
