= 2010 in Togo =

- Decades: 1990s; 2000s; 2010s; 2020s
- See also: Other events of 2010; History of Togo

Events of the year 2010 in Togo

== Incumbents ==
- President: Faure Gnassingbé
- Prime Minister: Gilbert Houngbo

== Events ==
- February 15: Stadium in Sokodé inaugurated
- March 4: 2010 Togolese presidential election
- March 7: Beginning of 2010–2011 Togolese protests
- March 8: Togolese diplomats convene for reorganization meeting in Lomé
- March 24: Security forces injure 30 civilians during a candlelight vigil in protest of Gnassingbé regime
- May 12: Togo establishes diplomatic relations with Finland
- September 29: Ghana and Togo begin cooperation to tackle cross-border crime near Aflao

== Establishments ==
- National Alliance for Change (October 10)

== Deaths ==
8 August – Massamasso Tchangai, footballer (b. 1978).
