= Bernadette Essossimna Legzim-Balouki =

Togolese politician

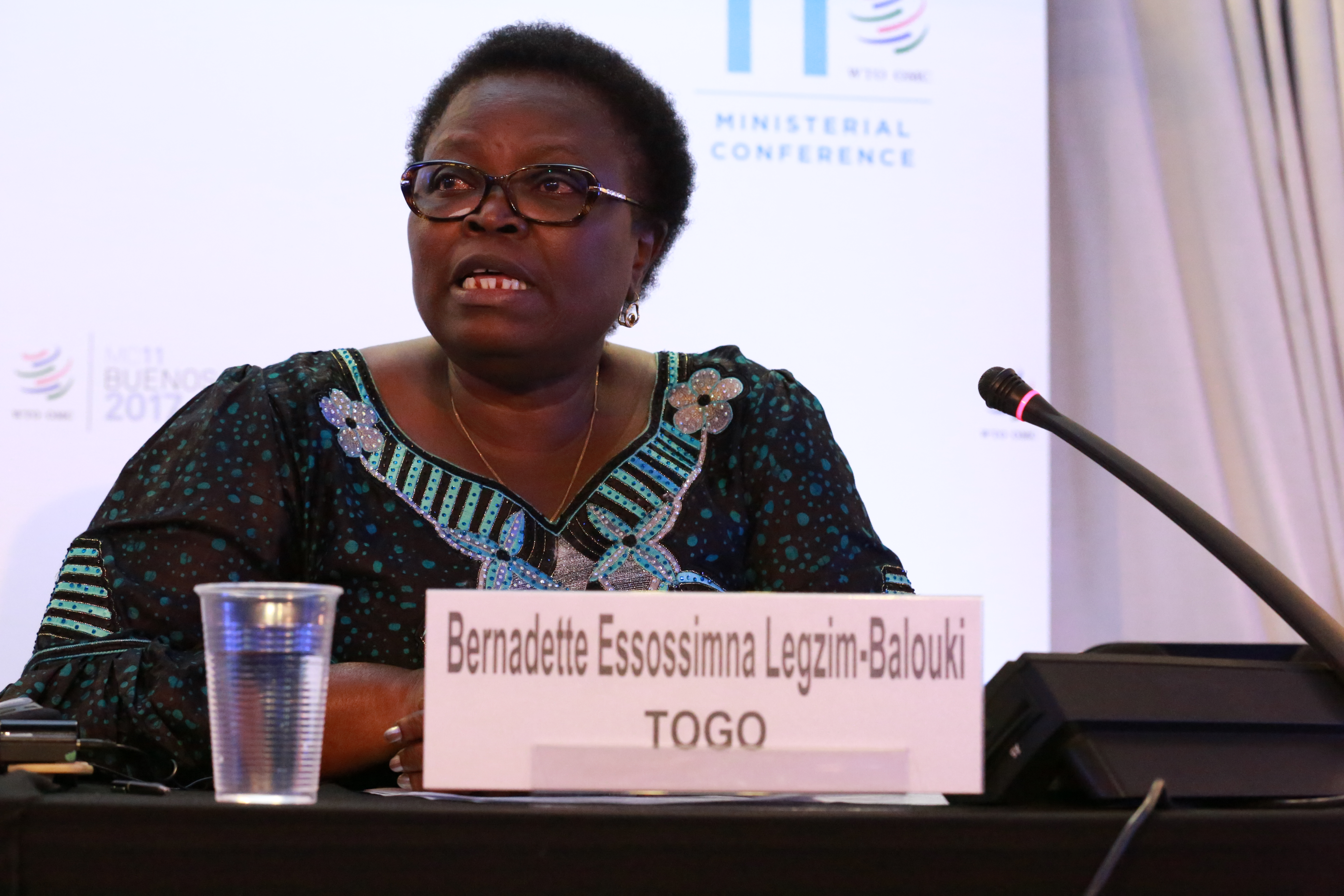

Bernadette Essossimna Legzim-Balouki (born January 20, 1959, in Lomé) is a Togolese politician.

Legzim-Balouki was Minister of Primary, Secondary and Literacy Education in Gilbert Fossoun Houngbo's second government.

Later, Legzim-Balouki was Minister of Trade and Private Sector Promotion in Arthème Kwesi Séléagodji Ahoomey-Zunu's government.
