= 2009 in Togo =

- Decades: 1980s; 1990s; 2000s; 2010s; 2020s
- See also: Other events of 2009; History of Togo

Events of the year 2009 in Togo

== Incumbents ==
- President: Faure Gnassingbé
- Prime Minister: Gilbert Houngbo

== Events ==
- February 6: Mathurin Nago, President of the Beninese National Assembly, visits with Eyadéma at the Presidential Palace
- February 18: Togolese security forces shoot and kill three serial robbers of patrons of the Lomé International Airport
- March 13: France and Togo sign new defense agreement
- April 1: Togolese government announces plans to abandon the West African CFA franc, although this never comes to fruition
- April 15: Politician and brother of the president, Kpatcha Gnassingbé, is arrested under allegations of plans to overthrow the president
- November 11: Yawo Adomayakpor appointed ambassador to the Democratic Republic of the Congo
- December 9: French embassy secretary expelled from Togo
