= 2011 in Togo =

- Decades: 1990s; 2000s; 2010s; 2020s
- See also: Other events of 2011; History of Togo

Events of the year 2011 in Togo

== Incumbents ==
- President: Faure Gnassingbé
- Prime Minister: Gilbert Houngbo

== Events ==
- January 20: Prime Minister of Ivory Coast Guillaume Soro begins diplomatic visit to Togo
- February 1: Togo and Ethiopia sign technical assistance agreement for training of Togolese agricultural and sanitation workers
- March 28: 50 Togolese businessmen visit New Delhi to promote economic cooperation with India
- April 3: Air bridge from Abidjan established to evacuate Togolese nationals from Ivory Coast
- May 27: University of Lomé temporarily closed due to student riots
- June 15: Healthcare providers begin strike in protest of government
- June 29: Ecobank Group opens new headquarters in Lomé
