= Cina Lawson =

Togolese politician

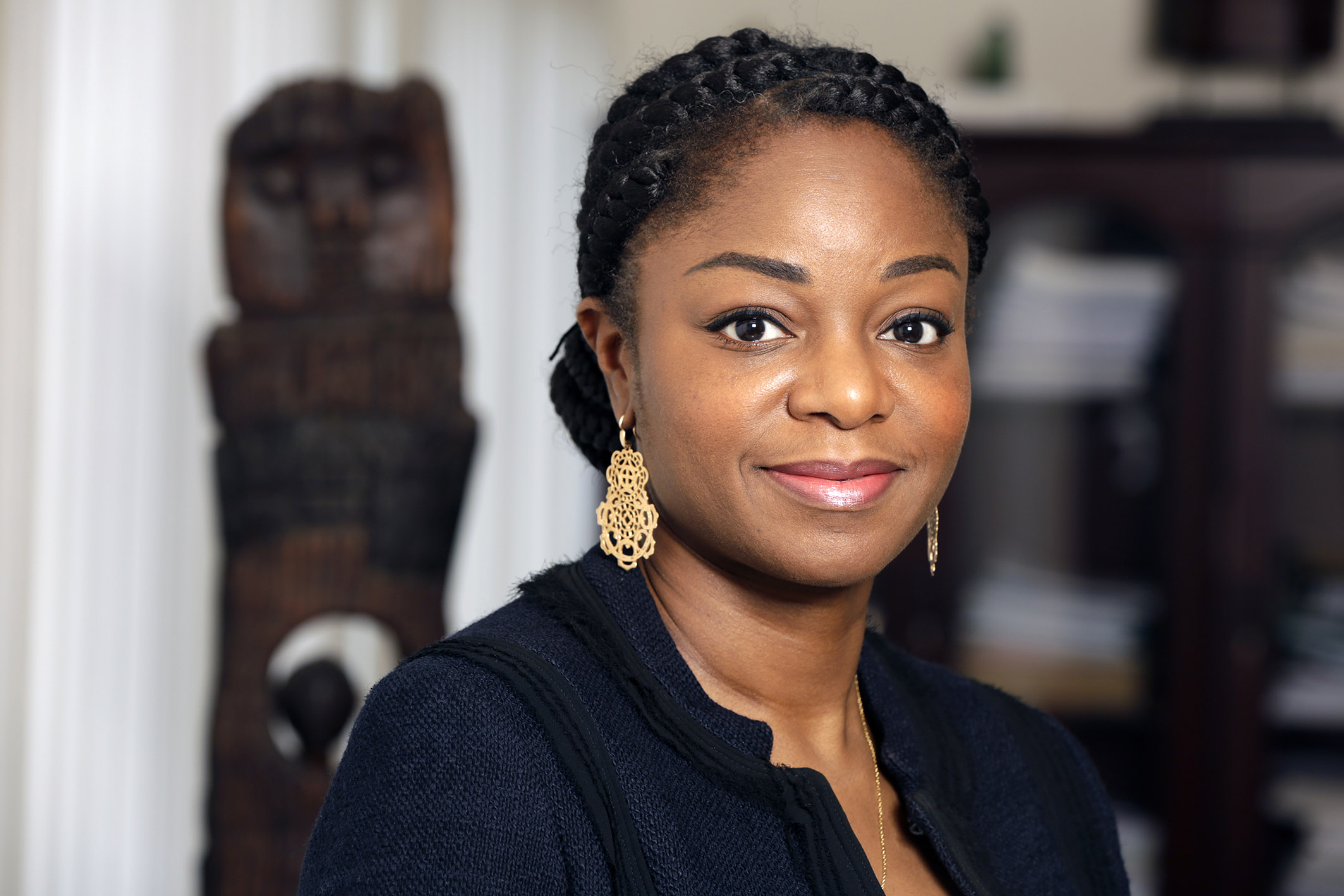
- Cina Lawson in 2016

Togolese Minister of Digital Economy and Transformation
- Incumbent
- Assumed office October 1, 2020
- President: Faure Essozimna Gnassingbé
- Prime Minister: Victoire Tomegah Dogbé

Minister of Posts, Digital Economy and Technological Innovation
- In office January 24, 2019 – September 25, 2020
- President: Faure Essozimna Gnassingbé
- Prime Minister: Komi Sélom Klassou

Minister of Posts and Digital Economy
- In office September 16, 2013 – January 4, 2019
- President: Faure Essozimna Gnassingbé
- Prime Minister: Arthème Ahoomey-Zunu, Komi Sélom Klassou

Minister of Posts and Telecommunications
- In office May 28, 2010 – September 16, 2013
- President: Faure Essozimna Gnassingbé
- Prime Minister: Gilbert Fossoun Houngbo

Personal details
- Education: Harvard University (Master); Sciences Po (MS, BA)

Cina Lawson is a Togolese politician, currently serving as Minister of Digital Economy and Digital Transformation, a role she has occupied since 2010.

Educated at Sciences Po and Harvard University, Lawson worked in telecommunications before her appointment to the government office, where she spearheaded numerous digitization and ICT initiatives.

Lawson has received international accolades for her work, including from the World Economic Forum, Forbes, and Jeune Afrique. In 2019, she received the Harvard Kennedy School Alumni Public Service Award, the first female African political figure to do so.

== Education ==
In 1996, Cina Lawson graduated from the Institut d'études politiques de Paris after two years of studies in the economic and financial program. She then obtained a master's of advanced studies in Applied Economics. She also holds a degree in history from the University Paris X.

Cina Lawson then continued her studies in the United States, where she received a master's in Public Policy from the John F. Kennedy School of Government at Harvard University.

== Career ==
Lawson began her career in the communication and information technology department of the World Bank, in Washington DC. There, she advised governments on various matters such as telecom policies, regulatory reforms or privatization. She also worked as a consultant for Alcatel-Lucent in Paris. From 2006 to 2010, she worked for France Telecom North America (Orange Group) in their business development department.

=== Minister for Digital Economy and Digital Transformation ===
In May 2010, Togolese Prime Minister Gilbert Houngbo appointed Lawson Minister of Posts, Digital Economy and Technological Innovation. As minister, Lawson contributed to the development of Togo's digital administration, to the integration of ICT in the education system, and to increasing internet access for the population of Togo. Under her tenure, the mobile internet penetration rate expanded from less than 2% in 2010 to 74% in 2021. She also initiated and led legal and regulatory reforms to enable private investments in the telecoms sector, as exemplified by the privatization of the incumbent operator, Togocom.

Early digitization efforts focused on young entrepreneurs included the Togo Youth Entrepreneur Forum, launched in 2013 with the goal of "providing young Togolese entrepreneurs with the theoretical and technical skills necessary to create enterprises in Togo." Two years later, to foster essential computer programming skills among the young population, she launched Appstogo, a nationwide app development contest. Togo was also represented at Africa Code Week, with Lawson billed as a patron of the event.

In 2015, Lawson negotiated the installation of a 250 km fibre-optic network in Togo's capital Lomé to provide high-speed internet access for all state-owned buildings, including hospitals and universities. This was followed in 2018 by the Wifi Campus initiative, a fibre-optic network connecting public university campuses and hospitals in Lomé and Kara.

=== Legal and Regulatory Framework ===
Since 2012, she has passed policies that have laid the foundation for digital transformation and private sector investments in Togo. Some of these new laws include the electronic and communications law passed in 2012, the electronic transaction law of 2017, the cybersecurity law of 2018, the law on personal data protection of 2019, the biometric identification law of 2020, the decree on citizen payment digitization, and the 2021 law on digitization.

=== Market Reforms ===
In June 2017, to improve efficiency and accessibility, Lawson officially awarded two internet service provider (ISP) licenses to TEOLIS SA and Groupe Vivendi Africa Togo (GVA Togo). Teolis launched its first offers based on LTE technology to corporate customers on 22 February 2018. In 2020, Togo was the first West African country to offer 5G services.

In July 2017 she began restructuring Togo's historic landline telecommunications operator Togo Telecom and its mobile arm Togocel. This reorganization led to sweeping changes in the internal structure of the operators and their fusion into a single organization. In 2018, Lawson opened Togocom Group to private investment, paving the way for the privatization of state-run companies.

In November 2019, the Togolese government accepted a bid by Agou Holding to acquire a 52% stake in Togocom Groupe, valuing the company at $343 million. Agou Holding is a consortium of Madagascar's Axian Group and the pan-African private equity group Emerging Capital Partners (ECP). The new majority stakeholder plans to invest $214 million over the next seven years to overhaul Togocom's service delivery. In a press statement following the announcement Cina Lawson stated that the deal "marks a crucial step in the government's digital roadmap."

=== Innovation and COVID-19 response ===
During the COVID-19 pandemic, Lawson and her team launched the digital emergency cash transfer program (NOVISI), which dispersed an estimated $34 million in financial aid to more than 920,000 people (almost a quarter of the adult population of Togo). This emergency response and financial inclusion program leveraged mobile technology, artificial intelligence, satellite imagery, cellphone metadata, and machine learning, to identify and enroll the most vulnerable Togolese citizens to receive digital cash support. In October 2021, the Fisher Center for Business Analytics at UC Berkeley awarded her the woman of the year award for this achievement.

In addition to the NOVISI payments program, Togo's COVID-19 response also included the digitalization of vaccination and testing, allowing Togolese citizens to register for vaccination online or via USSD messages. 50,000 people signed up within a month of the program's launch.

=== Google's Equiano Landing in Togo ===
On March 18, 2022, Cina Lawson's ministry oversaw the landing of Google's Equiano's subsea internet cable in Togo, its first landing point in Africa. CSquared manages the cable and its data. Lawson envisioned and negotiated these deals. This cable was a significant step in realizing Togo's vision to become a regional digital hub, which Lawson views as her mandate, as stated in an interview with Bloomberg.

An economic impact assessment of Equiano in Togo by Africa Practice and Genesis Analytics estimates that Equiano will add approximately 37,000 new jobs and increase Togo's economic output by an additional $351 million between 2022 and 2025.

To further ensure proper setup, deployment, and functionality of Equiano in Togo, Lawson coordinated the creation of a joint venture known as CSquared Woezon, a strategic partnership between Société d'Infrastructures Numérique (SIN) a state-owned telecommunications asset company and CSquared, an open-access wholesale broadband infrastructure company. CSquared Woezon is a Togolese company, with a minority public shareholding: 56% owned by CSquared, 44% owned by SIN.

=== Data Protection, cybersecurity, and the Lomé Declaration ===
In February 2019, Lawson created the Togo National Cybersecurity Agency, and in September 2019 launched Cyber Defense Africa, a cybersecurity services company. Cyber Defense Africa is a joint venture between Togo and Asseco Group, a leading Polish IT firm, which provides enhanced cybersecurity for citizens' public and private organizations in Togo and the sub-region, and trains African cybersecurity experts. She also pushed for the adoption of a law to set up a personal data protection authority (IPDCP) in 2020. Under the auspices of the Ministry of Digital Economy and Digital Transformation, Cina Lawson partnered with the United Nations Economic Commission for Africa (UNECA) to organize Africa's first cybersecurity summit in Lomé, which was held in March 2022 to discuss innovative approaches, strategy, and policy towards enhancing cybersecurity on the continent.

The Lomé Declaration on Cybersecurity and Protection against Cybercrime was signed by the UN and many African countries, which committed themselves to work together to fight cybercrime in Togo and Africa. The commitment to cybersecurity followed the 2019 announcement of Cyber Defense Africa, a joint venture between the government of Togo and Asseco Data Systems.

=== FinTech, financial inclusion and pay as you go ===
In May 2018, with the postal agency, Lawson launched the ECO CCP mobile bank account, designed to boost economic inclusion and financial access. One of the critical features of the ECO CCP digital money account is its ease of access; for example, no administrative procedures are required to open an account. In November 2017, Lawson also launched the presidential initiative CIZO to provide solar electricity to all citizens. CIZO is a pay as you go model. Customers are provided with free individual solar kits to power essential home equipment (lights, radio, TV etc.) and pay via digital banking on a per-watt basis.

=== Digital transformation in the public sector ===
In 2021, Lawson launched the Togolese Digital Agency (Agence Togo Digitale ATD) to foster the emergence of a digital innovation eco-system in Togo. This agency launched Public Service, the national platform for all national public services, and Togo Voyage, the official website for all travel in and out of Togo.

=== International Memberships ===
Lawson is a member of the World Bank Group's Advisory Council on Gender and Development, which is the main external consultative body helping the World Bank Group promote gender equality. She also sits on the Board of Directors of Innovations for Poverty Action, an anti-poverty research and policy nonprofit. In November 2022, she joined CEGA's External Advisory Board, which advises CEGA on high-level strategy, fundraising, and partnership development for a two-year renewable term.

== International Awards and Recognition ==
- In March 2012, Lawson was named a "Young Global Leader" by the World Economic Forum.
- In May 2013, she featured in current affairs magazine Jeune Afrique's list of the "25 most influential women in African business".
- In 2016 Lawson appeared among the top 55 "African Doers" compiled by Tropics Magazine, among other public figures deemed to have contributed significantly to the continent's dynamism.
- In January 2019, Les Napoléons Awards named Cina Lawson 'The Most Innovative Person of the Year'.
- In May 2019 the Harvard Kennedy School of Government awarded Lawson its Alumni Public Service Award. The award was given in recognition of her public service as a minister in Togo, notably her contribution to developing the country's digital economy and ICT sector. She is the first African woman political figure to receive the award since it was established in 1997.
- In 2021, UC Berkeley named Cina Lawson its 'Woman of the Year' at its World Business Analytics Award.
- In May 2022, Rest of World, an online tech magazine, identified Lawson as one of the 100 people outside Silicon Valley and the West whose efforts have directly impacted countries where most of the world's population lives.

== See also ==
- Faure Gnassingbe
- Kwesi Ahoomey-Zunu
- Victoire Tomegah Dogbé
- Komi Selom Klassou
- Gilbert Houngbo
