= 2008 Maltese general election =

- 8 March 2008

All seats in the House of Representatives
- Turnout: 93.3% (▼2.7pp)
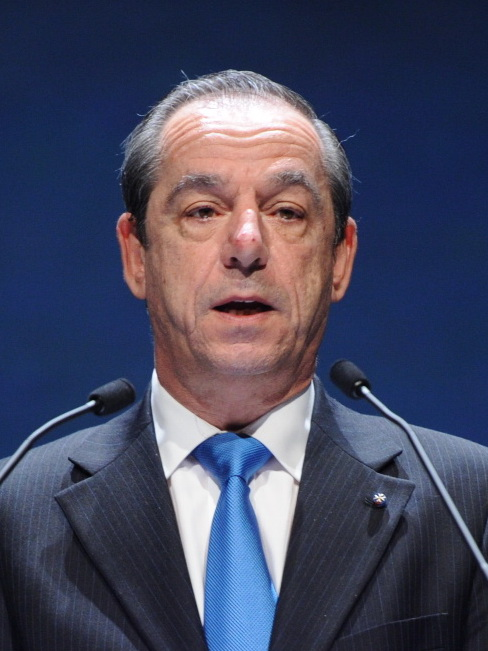

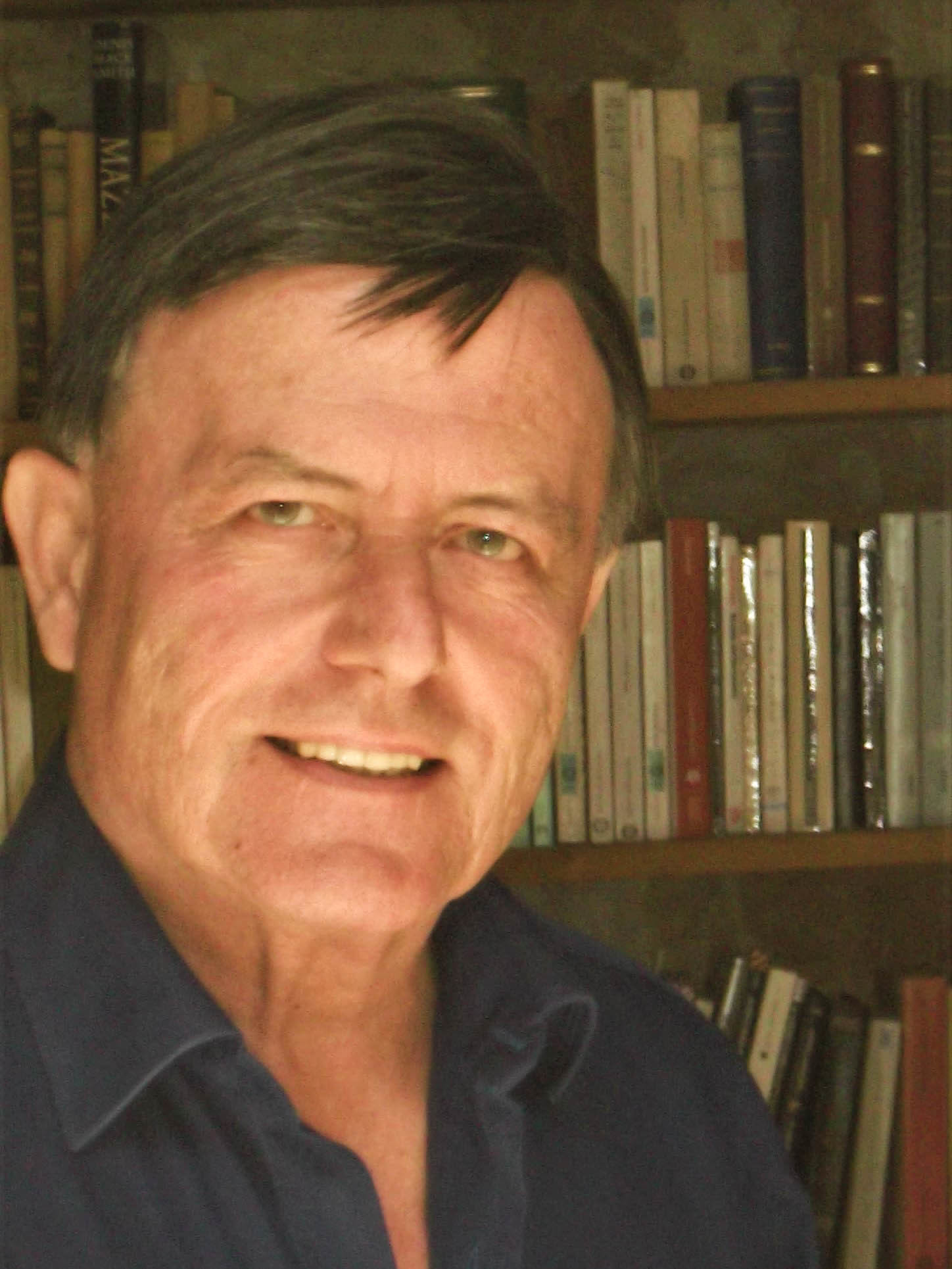
	First party	Second party
Leader	Lawrence Gonzi	Alfred Sant
Party	Nationalist	Labour
Last election	51.79%, 35 seats	47.51%, 30 seats
Seats won	35	34
Seat change	Steady	▲4
Popular vote	143,468	141,888
Percentage	49.34%	48.79%
Swing	▼2.45pp	▲1.28pp
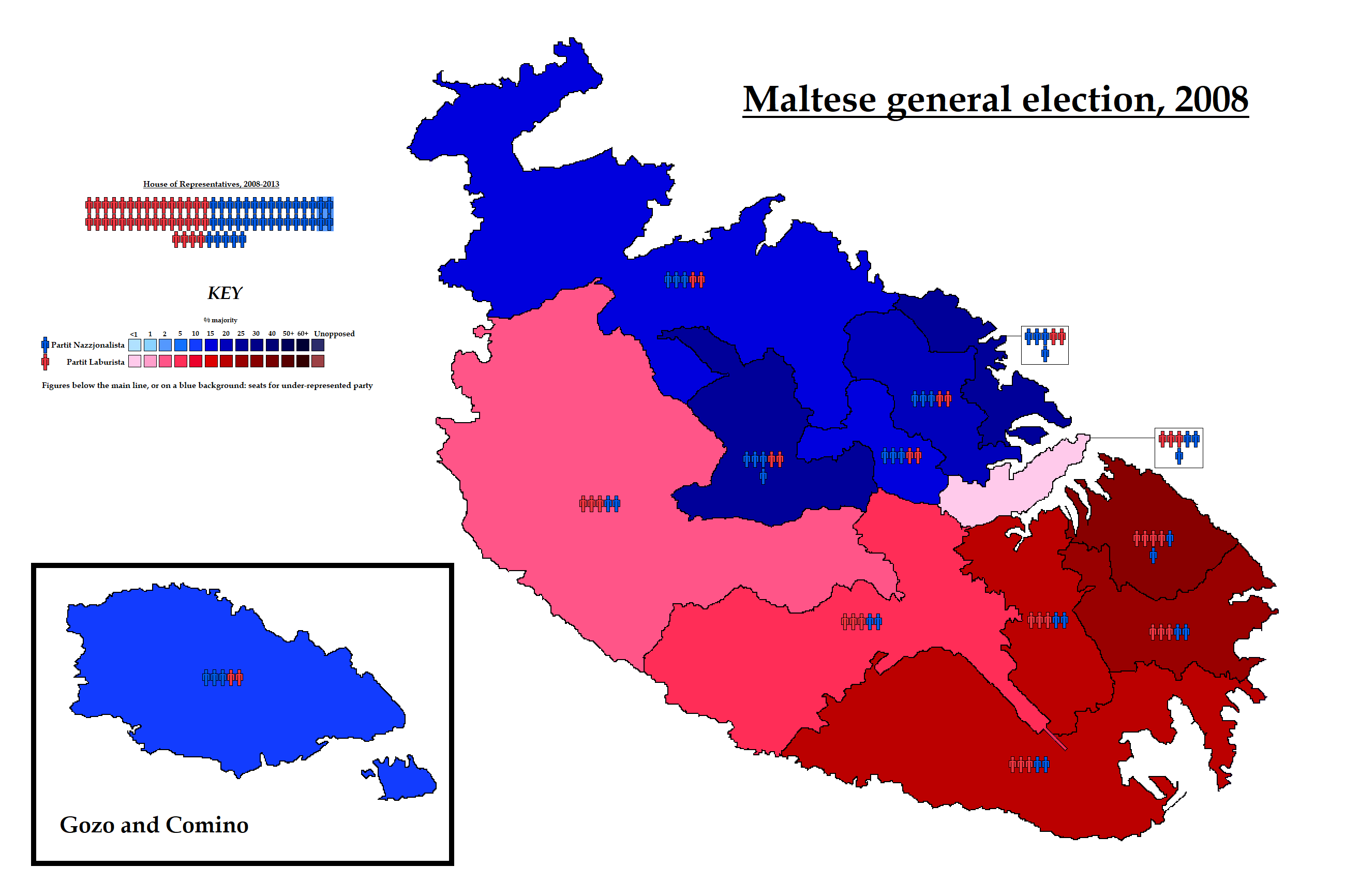
Prime Minister before election
Lawrence Gonzi
Nationalist
Elected Prime Minister
Lawrence Gonzi
Nationalist

General elections were held in Malta on 8 March 2008 to elect all members of Parliament. They took place alongside local elections. The elections were contested by the Nationalist Party, the Malta Labour Party (later known simply as the Labour Party). The governing Nationalist Party led by Lawrence Gonzi won its third consecutive election against Alfred Sant's Labour Party, winning the popular vote by a margin of just 0.55% and with its majority in parliament reduced to just one seat. Voter turnout was 93.3%.

== Background ==
Alfred Sant, Labour's candidate, had served as prime minister from 1996 to 1998 and led the party to two electoral defeats.

=== The Gonzi administration ===
It was the first election held since Malta joined the European Union, now deemed a milestone in the country's history.

From 2003 to 2006, the number of African migrants landing in Malta tripled, many of them landing by accident while on their way to Italy. They would be confined in a detention centre for up to a year and a half till, if applicable, they were given humanitarian aid or refugee status and released. As an EU member, Malta had to receive such immigrants provided that it was the first country in the EU they entered. In the words of the BBC's Alix Kroeger, Malta was "struggling to cope".

=== Procedure ===
The House of Representatives was dissolved on 4 February, with elections scheduled for 8 March, the same day that local elections were to be held in 23 of 68 local councils.

The system of voting used was, as in previous elections, proportional representation through modified single transferable vote with five MPs to be returned from each of thirteen districts, so 65 constituency seats in total, with a variable number of at-large seats added to ensure that the overall first-preference votes are reflected in the composition of the House of Representatives.

== Campaign ==
=== Candidates ===
Eight parties contested: the Nationalist and Labour parties, alongside Harry Vassallo's Democratic Alternative, Josie Muscat's National Action, Norman Lowell's Imperium Europa, Victor Zammit's Gozitan Party, Emmy Bezzina's Alpha Liberal Democrats, and Forward Malta.

National Action was formed in June 2007 in response to the surge of migrants. Zammit, a Gozitan, had contested the 2004 European Parliament election.

The Nationalists' official campaign tune was "Iva, Flimkien Kollox Possibli", while Labour's primary anthem was Yazz's version of "The Only Way Is Up", with a slightly changed refrain.

=== Platforms ===
The Nationalist Party's programme, donning the slogan "Yes, together everything is possible" (Iva, flimkien kollox possibbli), supported, among other things, lowering the income tax, ending departure tax as well as taxes on credit cards and television sets, founding Smart City to create 5,600 jobs, setting up offshore wind farms, "[regenerating]" Valletta, and improving Ta' Qali Crafts Village.

Labour's manifesto, named "Plan for a new beginning" (Pjan għal bidu ġdid), pledged to amend the educational system, halve the new electricity surcharge, remove value-added tax on education and income tax on overtime, introduce compensation on public holdays that happen to fall on a Saturday or Sunday, and create programmes to attract first-time property buyers, et cetera.

Under the motto "Through your vote, change" (Bil-vot tiegħek, il-bidla), the Democratic Alternative emphasized the absence of a third party in Maltese politics and asserted that the two major parties were indistinguishable.

National Action's foremost policy proposal was to forbid illegal immigrants from entering Malta and to send a share of them to the EU if this could not be done, with founder Josie Muscat calling the recent uptick in immigration an "invasion". The party also supported a powerful, directly-elected, unaffiliated presidency. Its manifesto was named "Sovereignty, seriousness, justice" (Sovranità, serjetà, gustizzja).

In the runup to the 2004 European Parliament election, the Gozitan Party's Victor Zammit offered solutions to the disparity in Gozo's gross domestic product from Malta's and stressed the need for representation of Gozo's issues in Europe.

=== Course of events ===
MaltaToday's opinion polls in late 2007 showed no clear leading party. By July 2007, National Action was polling at around four-and-a-half to six percent.

Towards the campaign's end, the Nationalist member of parliament Jeffrey Pullicino Orlando rented his land in Mistra, Mellieħa, for a disco, rousing much public interest. On 1 March, Sant described his act as "scandalous, immersed in corruption, obscene and protected the interest of a small clique". Orlando then engaged in what the Times of Malta labels as a "bizarre" press conference where he attacked Sant. He later turned to the Labour Party. In his 2021 memoirs, Orlando claims that his performance in the press event won the Nationalists the election: "[Gonzi] confirmed that the tide turned in his favour in the final weeks of the campaign. The only development of note in the final weeks was Mistra." But pundits agree that the Mistra scandal harmed the Nationalist Party.

== Results ==
Initial exit polls and statistics suggested a very close result. Preliminary results had been expected by Sunday noon but these had to be delayed until a full first count was completed. By half past ten, Labour insiders had told MaltaToday that they were anticipating an 8,000 vote majority, a sentiment that lingered on for another three hours. However, by two, Nationalist insiders stated that the flow of results had turned to their favour.

The Nationalist Party won with 49.3% to Labour's 48.8% a difference of 1,580 votes. This marked its third victory in a row, the first such instance for any party in Maltese parliamentary history. Just under two percent of registered voters, 5,266 individuals, failed to collect their voting documents, so fewer than 310,000 people were eligible to vote on election day. In total, voter turnout was 93.3%, a drop of nearly three points from the previous election and the lowest since 1971. The Labour Party gained one point (percentage of the popular vote) from 2003, while the Nationalists dropped four points. The Nationalists were kept from winning an outright majority in parliament, and so it was assigned another four seats for a working majority. Sant resigned as leader of the Labour Party after the election.

Twelve casual elections were held in April to fill vacancies arising from candidates elected from two districts declining their second seat. Both the Nationalist Party and Labour each elected six members in this way, leaving the overall parliamentary numbers unchanged.

Party	Votes	%	Seats	+/–
Nationalist Party	143,468	49.34	35	0
Malta Labour Party	141,888	48.79	34	+4
Democratic Alternative	3,810	1.31	0	0
National Action	1,461	0.50	0	New
Imperium Europa	84	0.03	0	New
Gozitan Party	37	0.01	0	New
Alpha Liberal Democrats	21	0.01	0	New
Forward Malta	8	0.00	0	New
Independents	22	0.01	0	0
Total	290,799	100.00	69	+4
Valid votes	290,799	98.84		
Invalid/blank votes	3,415	1.16		
Total votes	294,214	100.00		
Registered voters/turnout	315,357	93.30		
Source: Nohlen & Stöver

== Analysis ==
The historian Dominic Fenech deems the results "as novel as [they] were repetitive". While Maltese elections had long "been characterised by highly polarised two-party contests, narrow margins of victory, and high voter turnout", the 2008 election boasted some unusual features, namely, its relatively low turnout, "slimmest imaginable" result, and its producing the same party in government thrice consecutively. Fenech raises the analogy of the tortoise and the hare to describe Labour's imagined reaction to losing against the Nationalists who had held power for twenty years, save for the two years of Sant's administration. After winning the 2003 election by virtue of supporting EU membership, he writes, the government's economic policy threatened its success. Joining the EU and adopting the Euro as the national currency introduced economic difficulties, and the government raised taxes and sold or reshaped companies in the public sector. Thus, "the economy under-performed and jobs were lost in the traditional manufacturing sector and in tourism."

MaltaToday wrote before the election that Malta's two-party rule suffered a small setback since the nation joined the European Union. In its view, the 2008 election would be the first with immigration as a political issue and the first under the "24/7 existence of a fast-growing inquisitive media". Just after the election, the Malta Independent opined that with such a narrow majority, the Nationalist government would struggle to fulfil its EU-related commitments. The paper attributed the Nationalists' victory in part to when the election was called, that is, when the economy was faring stably.

== See also ==
- List of members of the Maltese parliament, 2008–13
- 2008 Maltese local elections

== Bibliography ==
- Fenech, Dominic (September 2008). "The 2008 Maltese General Election: The Tortoise and the Hare". West European Politics. 31 (5): 1049–1054 – via University of Malta.
- Nohlen, Dieter; Stöver, Philip, eds. (2010). Elections in Europe: A Data Handbook. Nomos Publishing. p. 1309. ISBN 978-3832956097.
- Zammit, Max (May 2011). A Bibliography of General Election Manifestos of Maltese Political Parties from 1966-2008 (Diploma long essay). University of Malta.
- "Election Special" (PDF). MaltaToday. No. 8. 10 March 2008. pp. 1–23.
