= Pema Gyamtsho =

Bhutanese politician

- པདྨ་རྒྱ་མཚོ།
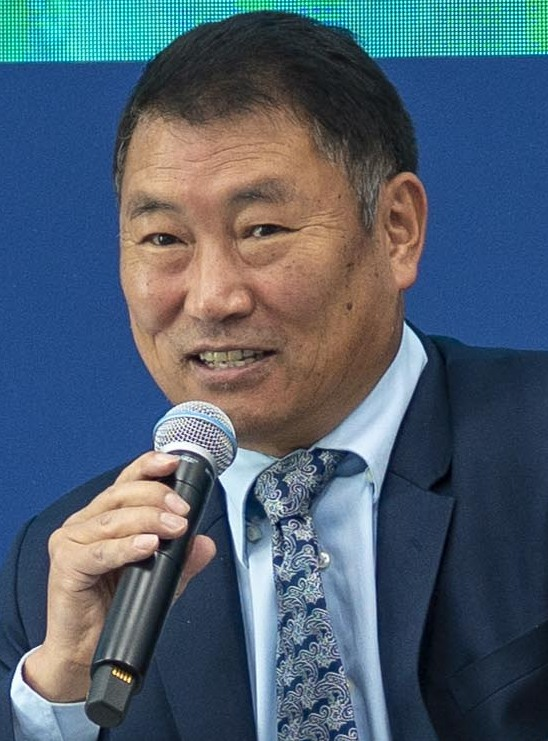
- Pema Gyamtsho in 2023

Leader of the Opposition
- In office 7 November 2018 – September 2020
- Preceded by: himself
- Succeeded by: Dorji Wangdi
- In office 13 July 2013 – 1 August 2018
- Preceded by: Tshering Tobgay

Member of the National Assembly of Bhutan
- In office 31 October 2018 – 2020
- Succeeded by: Dawa
- Constituency: Chhoekhor-Tang
- In office 2013–2018
- Constituency: Chhoekhor-Tang
- In office 2008–2013
- Constituency: Chhoekhor-Tang

President of Bhutan Peace and Prosperity Party
- In office 3 December 2013 – September 2020
- Preceded by: Jigme Thinley
- Succeeded by: Dorji Wangdi

Personal details
- Born: 15 November 1961 (age 64)
- Party: Bhutan Peace and Prosperity Party

Pema Gyamtsho (Dzongkha: པདྨ་རྒྱ་མཚོ།, Wylie: pad+ma rgya mtsho, born in 1961) is a Bhutanese politician who served as the Second Party President of the Bhutan Peace and Prosperity Party and Opposition Leader in the National Assembly of Bhutan from 2013 until his resignation in 2020. Since then he has been the Director General of International Centre for Integrated Mountain Development (|ICIMOD) . He also served as the Minister of Agriculture and Forests in the first elected government of Bhutan.

== Career ==
In 1990, he graduated with an M.Agr.Sc (Hons) from New Zealand, with a thesis on lucerne grass, and in 1996 he took Ph.D. from ETH Zurich. He was a member of the Planning Commission, Sustainable Development Secretariat, Centre for Bhutan Studies, Forestry Development Corporation Board and Founding Co-Chairman of Bhutan Water Partnership. Later he was promoted to the Deputy Secretary of Policy Planning Division, Ministry of Agriculture. He worked with International Centre for Integrated Mountain Development based in Kathmandu, Nepal as a specialist in watershed. Ultimately he became the Deputy Resident Coordinator of Helvetas Swiss Intercooperation.

In 2007, he became a member of Druk Phuensum Tshogpa (Bhutan Peace and Prosperity Party), and his name was registered in the constituency of Bumthang District for the General Election (the election of National Assembly). In March 2008, he won a clear victory in his constituency, and in April 2008 he was appointed the First Minister of Agriculture and Forest in the Democratic Government of Bhutan.

In 2013, he ran for re-election in the General Election. While DPT was beaten by People's Democratic Party (PDP) in this election, he was elected the Member for the second term.

In July 2013, Jigme Thinley who had been the former Prime Minister and the President of Bhutan Peace and Prosperity Party submitted his resignation for the Member of National Assembly before beginning its Legislative Session. On 24 July 2013 Pema Gyamtsho was appointed the Opposition Leader in the National Assembly for the Second Legislative Session. On 3 December 2013 he was elected as the new Party President.

== Honours ==
- Bhutan :
  - The Royal Orange Scarf (7 November 2018).

== Footnotes ==
- Gyambo Sithey & Dr. Tandin Dorji, Drukyul Decides, Centre for Research Initiative (Thimphu), 2009.
