= Josie Muscat =

Maltese politician (born 1943)

Leader of Azzjoni Nazzjonali
- In office 2007–2010

Personal details
- Party: Azzjoni Nazzjonali
- Profession: Doctor

Josie Muscat (born 31 July 1943) is a Maltese politician, a former Nationalist MP (1966–1987), an independent local councillor in Marsascala (2006–2009) and co-founder of Azzjoni Nazzjonali (AN) (2007). He is a qualified doctor of medicine.

Muscat was leader of the PN youth section from 1967 to 1973 and later headed its workers' section.

He formed the Freedom Fighters Front after the 1981 election when Labour was re-elected with a majority of seats despite not getting the majority of votes. The grouping was a form of resistance action against Labour's authoritarian elements but its members were seen by many as sympathisers of European fascism. He broke from the party by voting against the constitutional amendments which preceded the 1987 elections, which he did not contest.

After 1987 he took a hiatus from political life and made a name for himself in the medical sector, setting up St James Capua Hospital. After the general elections of 2008, Josie Muscat resigned as leader of Azzjoni Nazzjonali after he and his party failed to win any seats.

Just two months after he resigned, he was persuaded to retain his post as Party Leader as no other party member contested his seat.

In 2012, he argued that domestic violence was a "reaction to provocation".

In 2017, Josie Muscat contested the general election on behalf of the Nationalist Party, more than 30 years after he fell out with the party leadership. In a surprise move, the PN approved his candidature on the second district, a Labour Party stronghold.
