= Ministry of Labour and Human Resources (Bhutan) =

Government ministry of Bhutan

Agency overview
- Jurisdiction: Government of Bhutan
- Minister responsible: Ugyen Dorji

The Ministry of Labour and Human Resources was a ministry of Bhutan responsible to facilitate human resource development for economic development and to ensure gainful employment for the Bhutanese workforce. With the enactment of the Civil Service Reform Act of Bhutan 2022, Ministries have been reconstituted and the Ministry of Labour and Human Resources is no more a ministry.

== Departments ==
The Ministry of Labour and Human Resources is responsible for:

- Department of Employment
- Department of Human Resources
- Department of Labour
- Department of Occupational Standards

== Minister ==
- Ugyen Tshering (2007–2008)
- Dorji Wangdi (2008–2013)
- Ngeema Sangay Tshempo (2013–2018)
- Ugyen Dorji (7 November 2018 - ...)
