= International Centre for Integrated Mountain Development =

Intergovernmental learning and knowledge sharing centre

Coordinates: 27.646412°N 85.323542°E

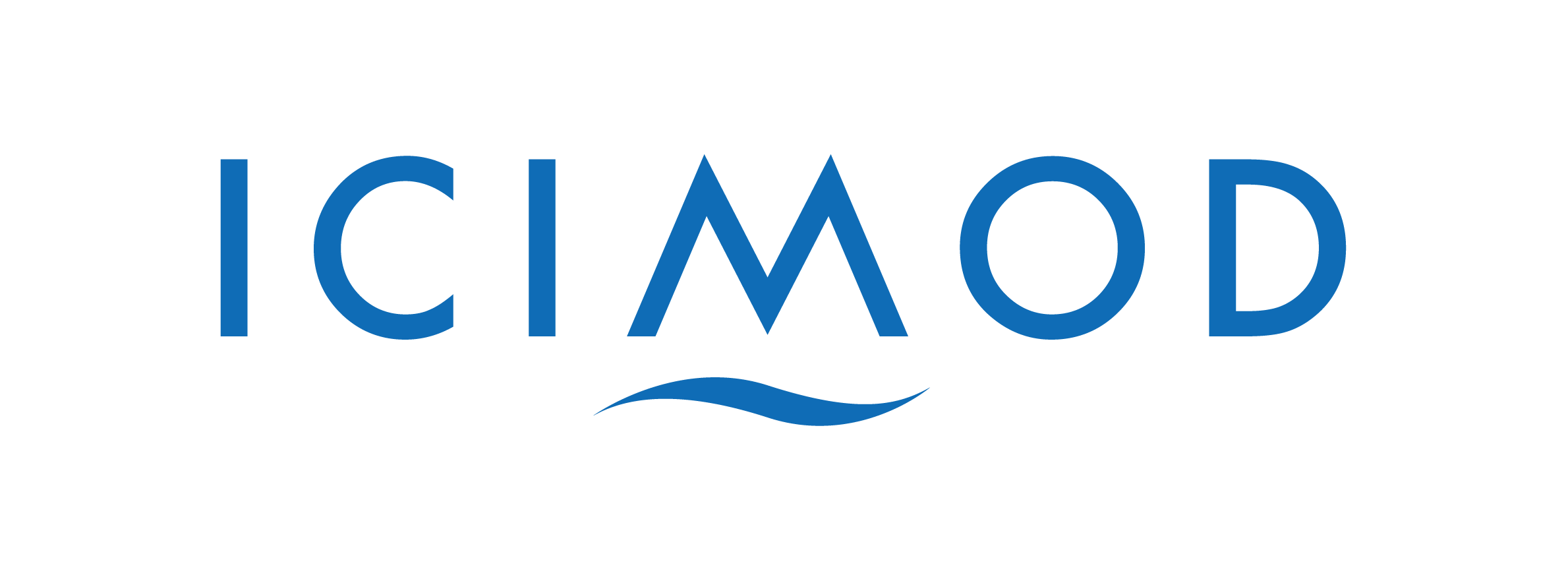
- ICIMOD Logo
- Formation: 5 December 1983 (42 years ago)
- Type: Intergovernmental organisation
- Headquarters: Lalitpur, Nepal
- Members: Afghanistan, Bangladesh, Bhutan, China, India, Myanmar, Nepal, Pakistan
- Director General: Pema Gyamtsho
- Website: icimod.org

The International Centre for Integrated Mountain Development (ICIMOD) is a regional intergovernmental learning and knowledge sharing centre founded in 1983, serving the eight regional member countries of the Hindu Kush Himalaya region – Afghanistan, Bangladesh, Bhutan, China, India, Myanmar, Nepal, and Pakistan. The HKH region is a vast area, encompassing mountain ranges stretching from the Hindu Kush range in northern Afghanistan to the Arakan range in Myanmar, with the Himalayan range as its spine, and also includes the Tibetan Plateau. ICIMOD's mission is to promote partnerships amongst the regional member countries to secure a better future for the people and environment of the region.

ICIMOD is headquartered at Khumaltar in the city of Lalitpur, located in the Kathmandu valley of Nepal. At Godavari in Lalitpur, ICIMOD has a Knowledge Park which exhibits some applications of ICIMOD's theoretical and field research. In addition, ICIMOD has country offices in Afghanistan and Pakistan. ICIMOD's partner organisations include national and international scientific institutions, government agencies, donor agencies, and the private sector, both within the region and outside.

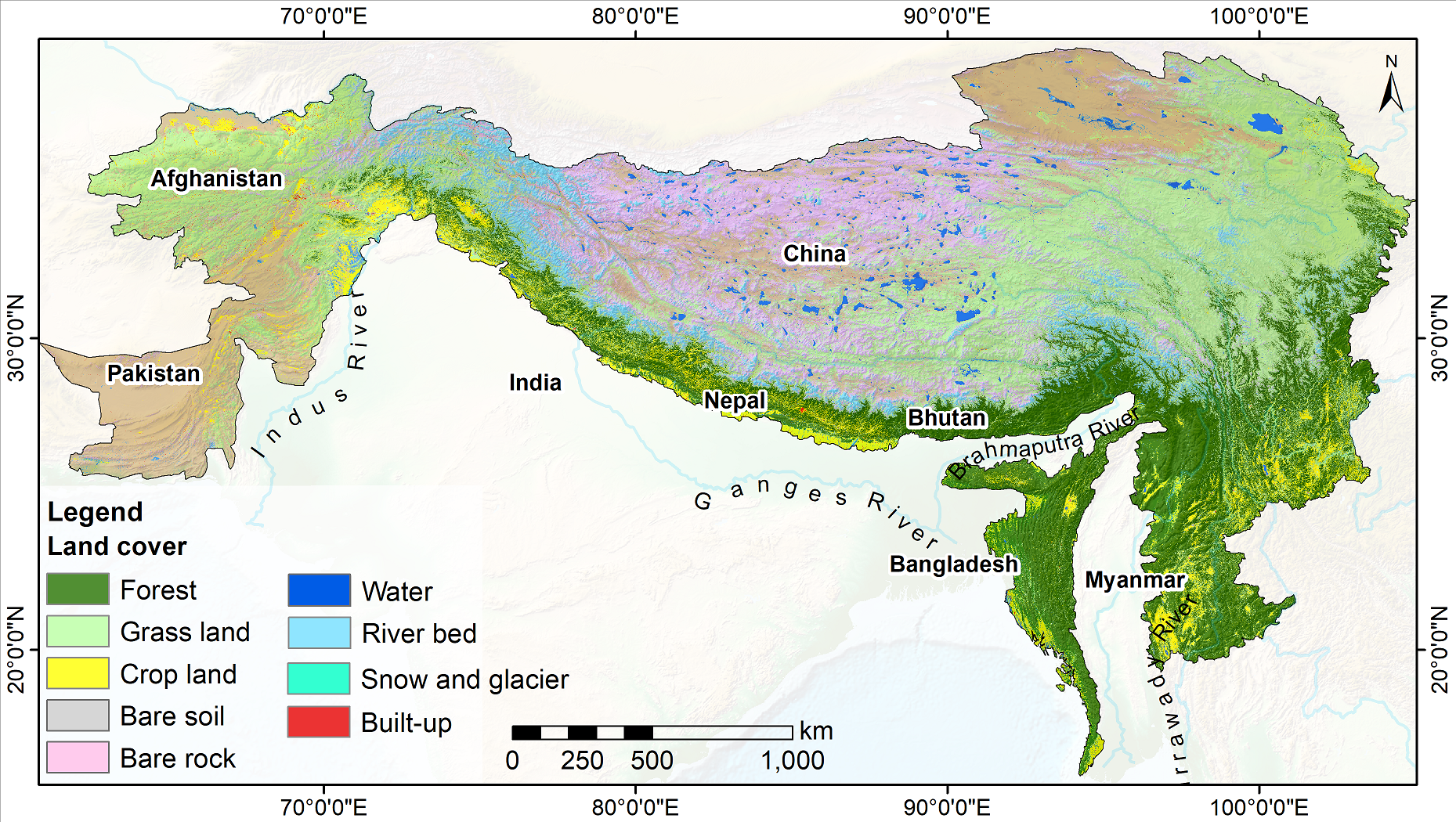
A map showing the Hindu Kush Himalaya region, with its land cover.

== History ==
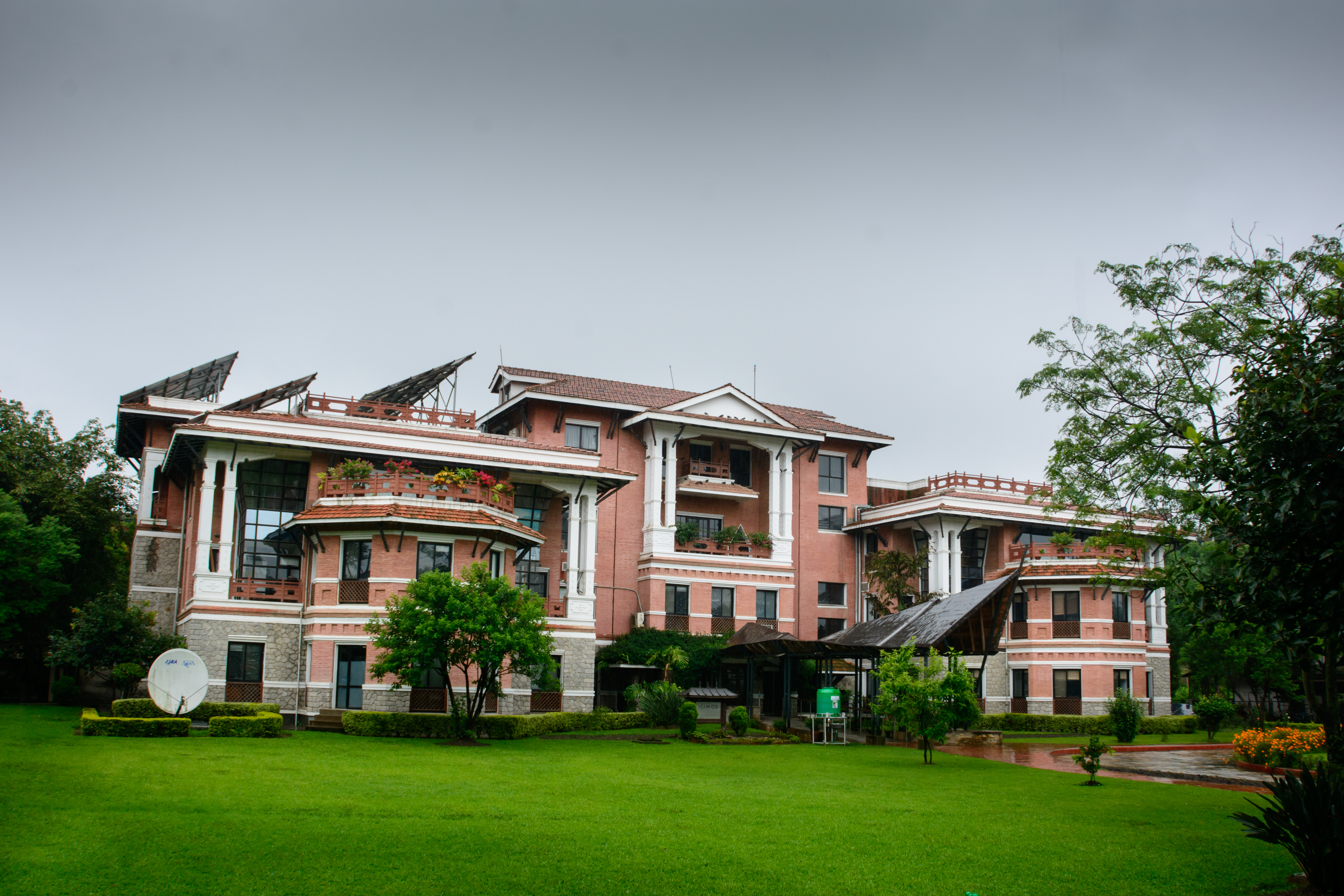
The ICIMOD headquarters at Khumaltar, Lalitpur

=== Origins ===
In December 1974, the idea of creating an institution to promote the ecologically sound development of mountainous regions was discussed at the International Workshop on the Development of Mountain Environment in Munich, German. In 1979 concrete commitments were made to establish the centre during a United Nations Educational, Scientific and Cultural Organisation (UNESCO) Regional Meeting in Kathmandu, under the framework of the Man and Biosphere Programme. The Japanese organization Institute for Himalayan Conservation, established by Jiro Kawakita, also sent a statement of intent for the establishment of ICIMOD to the Nepal government and the Man and Biosphere Programme of UNESCO. The Government of Nepal offered to host the new institution, and the Governments of Switzerland and the Federal Republic of Germany and UNESCO agreed to act as the founding sponsors. His Majesty's Government of Nepal and UNESCO signed the agreement that provided the legal basis for establishing the Centre in September 1981 in Paris. The centre was finally established and inaugurated on 5 December 1983 with its headquarters in Lalitpur, Nepal, and legitimised through an Act of Parliament in Nepal in the same year.

=== Headquarters ===
For the first 20 years, i.e. from late 1983 till late 2004, ICIMOD was based at a rented premises in Jawalakhel, Lalitpur. On 5 December 2004, the 21st anniversary of ICIMOD, a new headquarters for ICIMOD was inaugurated by King Gyanendra of Nepal at Khumaltar, Lalitpur. The 1.5 hectares for this headquarters campus, worth over US$1 million, were contributed by the Government of Nepal. The governments of China and India contributed US$100,000 each, for the construction of the new headquarters. The government of Pakistan committed US$100,000 for its construction. The government of Bangladesh contributed US$28,300, including a Bangladesh pavilion in the campus. The government of Bhutan contributed in kind, in the form of a Bhutan pavilion in the campus. In the earthquake of 25 April 2015 in Nepal, the headquarters received minor damages, but the Bhutan pavilion completely collapsed. The pavilion was subsequently rebuilt and re-inaugurated in 2016.

=== Directors/Director Generals of ICIMOD ===
Since its inception, ICIMOD has been headed by a male Director General. The first head of ICIMOD, Kenneth Colin Rosser, was designated as the 'Director' of ICIMOD and all subsequent heads have been designated as the 'Director Generals'. From 1984 until 2020, these Directors were from a country outside the Himalaya region. So far, all the Director Generals of ICIMOD have been men.

Following is a list of the Director Generals of ICIMOD until the present:

1. Kenneth Colin Rosser, from the United Kingdom (1984–1989)
2. E.F. Tacke, from the Federal Republic of Germany (1989–1994)
3. Egbert Pelinck, from the Netherlands (1994–2000)
4. Gabriel Campbell, from the United States of America (2000–2007)
5. Andreas Schild, from Switzerland (2007–2011)
6. David Molden, from the United States of America (2011–2020)
7. Pema Gyamtsho, from the Kingdom of Bhutan (2020–present)

== Organisational structure ==
=== Board of Governors ===
The highest governing body of ICIMOD is its Board of Governors, which consists of one high-ranking state official from each of its eight regional member countries, and independent members who are nominated by the ICIMOD Support Group based on their recognized professional expertise and experience. The ICIMOD Support Group consists of representatives from among the organizations and institutions that provide financial contributions to ICIMOD.

=== Funding ===
The programmes and activities of ICIMOD are supported by long-term sponsors, who provide funding to the institution. These include the governments of all the eight RMCs, and the governments of Australia, Austria, Norway, Sweden, and Switzerland. Programme donors include the ADA (Austria), BMZ and BMU (Germany), the UK govt, the EU, SIDA (Sweden), IDRC (Canada), IFAD, the Norwegian Ministry of Foreign Affairs, and USAID.

== Regional programmes ==
ICIMOD, USAID, and NASA operated SERVIR-Hindu Kush Himalaya, a joint initiative covering Afghanistan, Bangladesh, Myanmar, Nepal and Pakistan, until the Trump administration cut funding to the program in January 2025. The program focused on using satellite and geospatial analysis for disaster risk reduction. It also facilitated flood risk communication in collaboration with the Nepal Red Cross Society and maintained over 170 public data sets on glaciers, disasters and vulnerability.

=== Earth Observation Science at ICIMOD ===
ICIMOD actively uses earth observation science and applications for environmental management, disaster risk reduction, and enhanced resilience in the HKH region. Several ICIMOD researchers are involved in their research in different topics of earth observation science. Among the different remote sensing work, the Regional Land Cover Monitoring System (RLCMS) is most mentionable as that provides a series of 30-m resolution annual land cover maps with harmonized land cover data for the years 2000–2018. These regional land cover maps are highly consistent and are designed to serve explicit user-defined objectives. Besides that, ICIMOD is involved in rapid mapping of flood inundation for the Koshi river basin, Bangladesh, Nepal, soil erosion and sedimentation yield spatial distribution and many more mapping activities for the regions.

== Reception ==
Immediately after the April 2015 Nepal Earthquake, scientists at ICIMOD began supporting rescue and relief efforts by closely monitoring landslides, glacier lakes and dammed rivers through the analyses of satellite images, and providing the latest information to the Nepalese government and relief agencies. ICIMOD scientists also worked with traffic controllers at the Tribhuvan International airport, Kathmandu, by providing assistance to assess weather and terrain conditions. Teams of volunteers from ICIMOD went to aid relief efforts in villages nearby ICIMOD and Kathmandu.

A 2021 case study from the World Bank commented on ICIMOD's role as an apolitical intergovernmental platform:

In the Himalayas – where national interests are often seen as contradictory to regional interests – regional institutions are forced to devote considerable effort to making their case. ICIMOD's story demonstrates useful methods of achieving this objective: proactive engagement with political constituencies; efforts at reputation building through research to earn a place in likeminded global and regional networks; and hiring recognized subject experts to carry the institutional flag. These efforts are still a work in progress at ICIMOD, but they seem to be producing results.

== See also ==
- ICIMOD people
