= Dorji Wangdi =

Bhutanese politician

Leader of the Opposition of the National Assembly of Bhutan
- In office September 2020 – 3 February 2024
- Preceded by: Pema Gyamtsho
- Succeeded by: Pema Chewang

Member of the National Assembly of Bhutan
- In office 2008–2024
- Constituency: Panbang

Minister for Labour and Human Resources
- In office 2008–2013
- Prime Minister: Jigme Thinley
- Preceded by: Ugyen Tshering
- Succeeded by: Ngeema Sangay Tshempo

Personal details
- Born: 15 August 1969 (age 56) Karmabi, Goshing Gewog, Zhemgang District, Bhutan
- Party: Druk Phuensum Tshogpa

Dorji Wangdi (born 15 August 1969) is a Bhutanese politician who has been the leader of the Bhutan Peace and Prosperity Party since 2020, and a member of the National Assembly of Bhutan, from 2008 to 2024. He is former the Opposition leader of Bhutan after the resignation of Pema Gyamtsho from active politics.

== Education ==
He received an Honours Bachelor of Commerce degree from Sherubtse College, Bhutan. He completed his Master of Business Administration from Maastricht School of Management, Netherlands.

== Political career ==
Wangdi was elected for the first time to the National Assembly of Bhutan from Panbang constituency in 2008 Bhutanese National Assembly election on DPT seat and received 2,217 votes.

He was re-elected to the National Assembly of Bhutan as a candidate of DPT from Panbang constituency in the 2013 Bhutanese National Assembly election. He received 1,904 votes and defeated Tshering, a candidate of PDP and served as the Minister for Labour and Human Resources in Prime Minister Jigme Thinley's cabinet.

He was elected for the third time as a candidate of DPT to the National Assembly of Bhutan from Panbang constituency in 2018 Bhutanese National Assembly election. He received 2,984 votes and defeated Tshering, a candidate of DNT.
