= National Action (Malta) =

National Action Azzjoni Nazzjonali
- Abbreviation: AN
- Leader: Josie Muscat
- Founded: June 2007
- Dissolved: 2010
- Split from: Nationalist Party
- Headquarters: The Strand; Sliema
- Ideology: Neoliberalism; Nationalism
- Political position: Right-wing

Website
- www.azzjoninazzjonali.org

National Action (Maltese: Azzjoni Nazzjonali, AN) was a right-wing Maltese political party active between 2007 and 2010.

== History ==
The party was founded in June 2007, the two most prominent founders being Josie Muscat, a medical doctor and entrepreneur and a former MP of the Nationalist Party, and real estate magnate Anġlu Xuereb. Muscat was elected National Action's first Leader.

The party was best known for its position on immigration. It believed that Malta should close its borders to illegal immigration and, where this is not possible, the European Union (of which Malta is a member) should be obliged to share Malta's burden of illegal immigration. Illegal immigrants should be hosted in Malta for not more than a month, then being moved on to other states. The party has also called for a directly elected President of Malta with expanded powers and politically unaffiliated, a smaller Parliament and a Council of State. It also wanted to lower taxes using a flat tax methodology in exchange for more social responsibility and the curbing of social services abuse.

After the result of the general elections of 2008, Muscat announced his retirement from politics. He was eventually persuaded to stay on as Party Leader.

On 15 April 2010, after a second similar showing, this time in the 2009 elections for the European Parliament, the Party's executive committee proposed to transform the party into a pressure group.

No activities have been noted since.

== Election results ==
=== House of Representatives ===
| Election | Leader | Votes | % | Seats | +/– | Rank | Government |
|---|---|---|---|---|---|---|---|
| 2008 | Josie Muscat | 1,461 | 0.50 | 0 / 67 | New | 4th | Extra-parliamentary |

== See also ==
- Alleanza Nazzjonali Repubblikana
