= New Togolese Commitment =

Political party in Togo

The New Togolese Commitment (French: Nouvel Engagement Togolais, NET) is a political party in Togo.

== History ==
NET was established on 28 April 2012 by blogger Gerry Taama. The party joined the Rainbow Alliance prior to the 2013 parliamentary elections, with the alliance winning six of the 91 seats in the National Assembly. In the 2015 presidential elections Tamaa ran as the party's candidate, finishing fourth in a field of five candidates with 0.1% of the vote.
