= Alleanza Nazzjonali Repubblikana =

Maltese pressure group

National Republican Alliance Alleanza Nazzjonali Repubblikana
- Abbreviation: ANR
- President: Philip Beattie
- Founders: Philip Beattie; Martin Degiorgi; Paul Salomone
- Founded: 29 August 2005
- Dissolved: June 2007
- Merged into: National Action
- Ideology: Maltese nationalism Christian conservatism Anti-immigration
- Political position: Far-right
- Colours: Navy blue

Website
- www.anrmalta.info (archived)

The Alleanza Nazzjonali Repubblikana (ANR, National Republican Alliance) was a Maltese pressure group formed on 29 August 2005 with Martin Degiorgio, Philip Beattie and Paul Salomone as its spokespersons.

It had been described as "far-right" and was thought to have connections with the political party Imperium Europa. However, the Alliance disclaimed any such connections, describing itself as "a conservative, Christian-inspired, nationalist political pressure group".

The Alliance organised two demonstrations against illegal immigration in Valletta in 2005 and 2006. It faded with the creation of the National Action party in 2007.
