= Americans for Nonsmokers' Rights =

- Abbreviation: ANR
- Formation: 1976
- Type: Nonprofit
- Tax ID no.: 94-2598713
- Legal status: 501(c)(4)
- Headquarters: Berkeley, California, USA
- Affiliations: Americans for Nonsmokers Rights Foundation
- Website: https://nonsmokersrights.org/

Americans for Nonsmokers' Rights (ANR), founded in 1976, is an American member-supported 501(c)(4) tax-exempt non-profit national lobbying organization, based in Berkeley, California, "dedicated to nonsmokers' rights, taking on the tobacco industry at all levels of government, protecting nonsmokers from exposure to secondhand smoke, and preventing tobacco addiction among youth. ANR pursues an action-oriented program of policy and legislation."

According to a 2006 US Surgeon General's Report,

the first national organization to focus on the need for a local clean indoor air policy was ANR, which is still the recognized leader in the field. ANR has supported local efforts in a number of ways: providing technical assistance, training, and strategic guidance to local coalitions; keeping them informed of the latest policy trends and opposition tactics; linking a coalition with local coalitions in other parts of the country that were encountering similar experiences; developing 'best practices' guidelines (ANR 2002); and disseminating model ordinances. ANR maintains a database of local ordinances and their provisions in order to track progress in eliminating unintended loopholes and addressing legal issues.

The ANR maintains the US Tobacco Control Laws Database, "the only national repository of local tobacco-related ordinances and regulations in the United States," containing over 10,000 ordinances and 65,000 pages of laws.

== See also ==
- Regulation of tobacco by the U.S. Food and Drug Administration
- Tobacco-Free Pharmacies
