= Ugyen Dorji (DNT politician) =

Bhutanese politician

Lyonpo Ugyen Dorji

Minister for Home and Cultural Affairs
- Incumbent
- Assumed office 7 November 2018
- Prime Minister: Lotay Tshering
- Preceded by: Ngeema Sangay Tshempo

Member of the National Assembly of Bhutan
- Incumbent
- Assumed office 31 October 2018
- Preceded by: Dorji Choden
- Constituency: Thrimshing

Personal details
- Born: c. 1986
- Party: Druk Nyamrup Tshogpa
- Education: Sherubtse College; Lee Kuan Yew School of Public Policy

Ugyen Dorji (c. 1986) is a Bhutanese politician who was Minister for Labour and Human Resources from November 2018. and was the Minister for Home and Cultural Affairs since 2021 until 2023.

He has been a member of the National Assembly of Bhutan, as the MP for Thrimshing since October 2018.

He is currently a student of Diplomatic Studies at the University of Oxford.

== Early life and education ==
Dorji was born c. 1986.

He received a Master's degree in public policy from Lee Kuan Yew School of Public Policy, Singapore. He completed his Bachelor of Arts in English and Dzongkha from Sherubtse College, Bhutan.

== Professional career ==
Before entering politics, he was the desk officer at SAARC and a research assistant at the Institute of Water Policy, Lee Kuan Yew School of Public Policy, National University of Singapore from 2016 to 2017. He has worked in the ministry of foreign affairs from 2013 to 2018. He was also a reporter at The Journalist in 2011.

== Political career ==
Dorji is a member of Druk Nyamrup Tshogpa (DNT).

He was elected to the National Assembly of Bhutan in the 2018 elections for the Thrimshing constituency. He received 2,646 votes and defeated Chenga Tshering, a candidate of Druk Phuensum Tshogpa.

On 7 November 2018 he was sworn in as Minister for Labour and Human Resources.

Political offices
Preceded by Ngeema Sangay Tshempo	Minister for Labour and Human Resources; 2018–present	Incumbent
