= Issifou Tabiou Taffa =

Togolese political figure

Issifou Taffa Tabiou is a Togolese political figure who has been President of the National Independent Electoral Commission (CENI) in Togo since October 2009.

== Life and career ==
Tabiou Taffa is from Bassar in the Kara Region of northern Togo. He worked as Director of the Cabinet of the Ministry of Technical Education and Vocational Training for a time and was a member of CENI during the April 2005 presidential election as well as the October 2007 parliamentary election. He was subsequently a Technical Adviser to the Ministry of Territorial Administration, and he was sworn in as one of the 17 members of CENI on 1 September 2009, in preparation for the 2010 presidential election. Tabiou Taffa was appointed to CENI as one of three representatives of civil society.

Henri Kolani was subsequently elected as CENI President, but the opposition rejected the choice of Kolani and the resulting controversy interfered with CENI's work. Tabiou Taffa was then elected by consensus as President of CENI on 14 October 2009, resolving the controversy. Tabiou Taffa was not a member of any political party and was an obscure figure at the time of his election as CENI President. On that occasion, he stressed that CENI's work would be "collegial".
