= Guy Ryder =

British trade unionist (born 1956)

Guy Bernard Ryder CBE
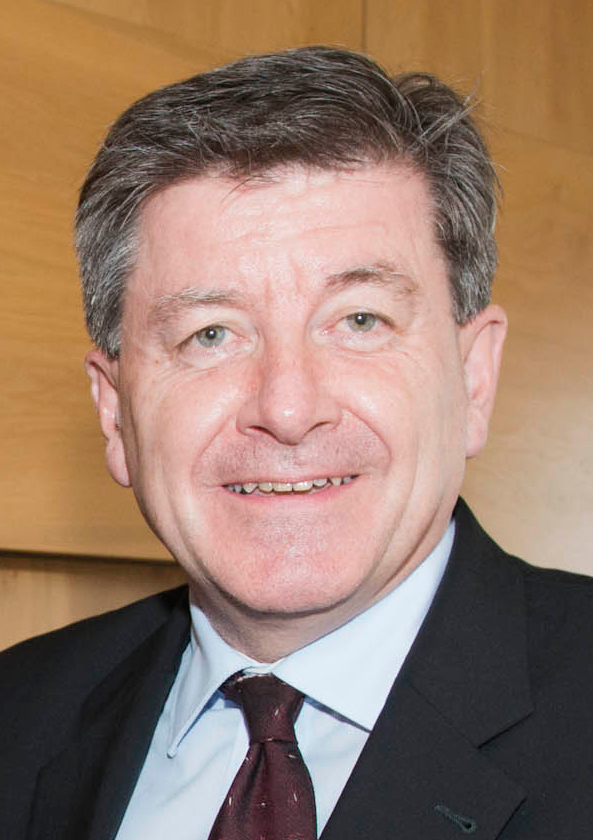
- Ryder in 2014

10th Director-General of the International Labour Organization
- In office 1 October 2012 – 1 October 2022
- Preceded by: Juan Somavía
- Succeeded by: Gilbert Houngbo

1st General Secretary of the International Trade Union Confederation
- In office November 2006 – June 2010
- Preceded by: new organisation
- Succeeded by: Sharan Burrow

General Secretary of the International Confederation of Free Trade Unions
- In office February 2002 – October 2006
- Preceded by: Lord Jordan
- Succeeded by: organisation abolished

Personal details
- Born: 3 January 1956 (age 70) Liverpool, England
- Education: University of Cambridge; University of Liverpool

Guy Bernard Ryder CBE (born 3 January 1956) is a British international civil servant who currently serves as Under-Secretary-General for Policy at the United Nations.

He was previously Director-General of the International Labour Organization from 2012 to 2022, General Secretary of the International Trade Union Confederation from 2006 to 2010 and General Secretary of the International Confederation of Free Trade Unions from 2002 to 2006.

== Education ==
Born in Liverpool, England, Ryder studied social and political sciences at the University of Cambridge and Latin American studies at the University of Liverpool.

In addition to his native English, he speaks French and Spanish.

== Career ==
=== Trade union organisations ===
Ryder began his career in 1981 as an assistant in the International Department of the Trades Union Congress in London and in 1985 he became secretary of the Industry Trade Section of the International Federation of Commercial, Clerical, Professional and Technical Employees in Geneva. In 1988 he became assistant director of the Geneva office of the International Confederation of Free Trade Unions (ICFTU), and in 1993 was appointed its director.

Ryder joined the International Labour Organization (ILO) in 1998 as director of its Bureau for Workers' Activities and in 1999 became director of the Office of the Director-General. It was during this time that the ILO's Decent Work Agenda was launched and won support from other international bodies.

In 2002 Ryder was appointed General Secretary of the ICFTU, based in Brussels, where he led a process described as the global unification of the democratic international trade union movement. He also became a leading figure in the Global Call to Action Against Poverty, for which he spoke at the 2005 World Summit. He was elected as first General Secretary of the International Trade Union Confederation when it was created in 2006 and headed its delegations to talks with the United Nations, International Monetary Fund, World Bank and World Trade Organization and to the G20 leaders' summits.

In September 2010 Ryder returned to the ILO in Geneva as an executive director, with responsibility for international labour standards and fundamental principles and rights at work. Among other activities, he supervised the application of ILO conventions and recommendations and headed ILO missions to address issues related to labour standards in several member countries, including Bahrain, Colombia, Fiji, Georgia, Greece, Myanmar and Eswatini.

=== Director-General of the International Labour Organization ===
Ryder was elected as Director-General of the ILO by its Governing Body in May 2012 and took office on 1 October 2012. On taking office, he pledged to position the Organization as a determined actor translating principle into action and ensuring that it had the capacity to make a major difference to the working lives of people on all of the continents. To support this he launched a major reform process geared to assuring the ILO's authority on matters falling within its mandate.

On 3 March 2022 Ryder echoed the strong condemnation by the United Nations General Assembly of the Russian war against Ukraine.

=== Under-Secretary-General for Policy at the United Nations ===
Following the conclusion of his term in October 2022, Ryder was appointed Under-Secretary-General for Policy in the Executive Office of António Guterres, the Secretary-General of the United Nations.

== Awards ==
Ryder was appointed Commander of the Order of the British Empire (CBE) in the 2009 Birthday Honours.

Positions in intergovernmental organisations
Preceded by Juan Somavia	Director-General of the International Labour Organization; 2012−2022	Succeeded by Gilbert Houngbo
