= Rainbow Alliance (Togo) =

Rainbow Alliance Coalition Arc-en-Ciel (French)
- Founded: 2012
- Ideology: Big tent Democracy; Human rights Factions; Pan-africanism; Democratic socialism Social democracy
- National Assembly: 5 / 91

The Rainbow Alliance (French: Coalition Arc-en-Ciel) is a political alliance in Togo.

== History ==
The alliance was formed in 2012 by the Action Committee for Renewal (which held four seats in the National Assembly), the Democratic Convention of African Peoples, the Union of Socialist Democrats, the Pan-African Democratic Party the Citizens' Movement for Democracy and Development and New Togolese Commitment. In the 2013 parliamentary elections it received 11% of the vote, winning six of the 91 seats in the National Assembly.

== Election results ==
=== Parliamentary election ===
Date	Votes			Seats	
Date	#	%	± pp	#	±
2013	204,143	10.8 %	+10.8	6 / 91	New
