= Agence nationale des renseignements (Togo) =

Intelligence agency of the Republic of Togo

The Agence nationale des renseignements, also known by its acronym ANR, is the intelligence agency of the Republic of Togo. The agency is responsible for a range of actions including information gathering, foreign intelligence, counterterrorism, counterintelligence, and surveillance. The service is closely linked to the Gnassingbé regime and is frequently a subject of controversy, particularly for its use of torture. Since October 2018, it has been led by Colonel Ali Esso Tchakpélé, a close associate of Faure Gnassingbé.

== Missions ==
The missions assigned to the service include "ensuring the internal and external security of the State" and "monitoring individuals or groups, whether nationals or foreigners, suspected of engaging in activities that undermine the security of the State".

== History ==
In 2012, the service came under scrutiny by the National Consultative Commission on Human Rights (CNDH) for allegations of torture and mistreatment of prisoners and political opponents. These acts of torture were reportedly carried out under the leadership of Yotrofei Massina, who was later transferred to head the gendarmerie. When the CNDH leader, Koffi Kounté, stated that the government's published version of the report was false, he had to flee Togo and seek refuge in France due to threats on his life.

In 2014, Faure Gnassingbé appointed Colonel Koulemaga Kassawa to lead the agency. Despite this, the Togolese president appeared not to have unlimited control over the service, where dissenting elements existed at that time.

By 2018, Gnassingbé named Colonel Ali Esso Tchakpélé as the head of the service, replacing Koulemaga Kassawa. This move was aimed at strengthening his control over the agency following a rebellion among officers within the state security apparatus. The choice of Ali Esso Tchakpélé was significant as he is a Kabye native of Pya, the historical lands of the Gnassingbé clan. He had previously served as interim head of the service in 2012 after Yotrofei Massina's transfer.
