= Citizens' Movement for Democracy and Development =

Political party in Togo

The Citizens' Movement for Democracy and Development (French: Mouvement Citoyen pour la Démocratie et le Développement, MCD) is a political party in Togo.

== History ==
The party was established on 2 February 2007, and received 0.6% of the vote in the parliamentary elections later that year, failing to win a seat. Prior to the 2013 parliamentary elections it joined the Rainbow Alliance, which went on to win six seats in the National Assembly.
