= Gilbert Houngbo =

Togolese politician and former Prime Minister

11th Director-General of the International Labour Organization
- Incumbent
- Assumed office 1 October 2022
- Preceded by: Guy Ryder

6th President of the International Fund for Agricultural Development
- In office 1 April 2017 – 8 July 2022
- Preceded by: Kanayo F Nwanze
- Succeeded by: Alvaro Lario

10th Prime Minister of Togo
- In office 8 September 2008 – 23 July 2012
- President: Faure Gnassingbé
- Preceded by: Komlan Mally
- Succeeded by: Kwesi Ahoomey-Zunu

Personal details
- Born: 4 February 1961 (age 65) Togo
- Party: Independent
- Education: University of Lomé; University of Quebec, Trois-Rivières

Gilbert Fossoun Houngbo (born 4 February 1961) is a Togolese politician and diplomat who was Prime Minister of Togo from September 2008 to July 2012. He has also held various positions within the United Nations System, including the United Nations Development Programme (UNDP), the International Labour Office and the International Fund for Agricultural Development (IFAD). In 2022 he was elected as the 11th Director-General of the International Labour Organization (ILO).

== Education and early career ==
Houngbo was born in rural Togo, the eleventh of eighteen children, and holds an advanced degree in business management from the University of Lomé in Togo. He moved to Canada in 1983 on a graduate scholarship and earned a degree in accounting and finance from the Université du Québec à Trois-Rivières. Houngbo stated in an interview in 2017 that this period deeply affected him and gave him a "sense of [his] place in the world". He obtained Canadian citizenship and worked at Price Waterhouse Canada, and is a member of the Canadian Institute of Chartered Accountants.

== Prime Minister of Togo ==
On 7 September 2008, President Faure Gnassingbé appointed Houngbo as Prime Minister of Togo; he replaced Komlan Mally, who had resigned two days earlier. His appointment as prime minister was read out in a decree by Kouessan Yovodevi, the Director of National Television. Houngbo took office on 8 September. Houngbo was a relatively obscure figure in Togo before his appointment, which was regarded as surprising. The government said that he was a "man of consensus" who would facilitate national reconciliation. Some observers attributed his appointment to a desire to improve the image of the government; there were suggestions that Mally had appeared ineffectual.

Houngbo travelled to the UN Headquarters in New York on 11 September for a visit to mark his departure from the UN. The same day, he met with UN Secretary-General Ban Ki-moon, who congratulated Houngbo on his achievements at the UNDP. In Togo, Houngbo's government was named on 15 September 2008. It included 27 ministers, aside from Houngbo himself: 3 ministers of state (one of whom was Houngbo's predecessor, Komlan Mally), 20 ministers, 2 minister-delegates, and 2 secretaries of state. Houngbo presented his general policy programme to the National Assembly on 16 September. Of the 80 deputies who participated in the vote on Houngbo's programme, 50 (representing the ruling Rally of the Togolese People) voted in favor of it; the opposition Union of Forces for Change voted against it, while the opposition Action Committee for Renewal abstained.

Gnassingbé was re-elected in the March 2010 presidential election and sworn in on 3 May 2010. Houngbo accordingly resigned as Prime Minister on 5 May, and Gnassingbé re-appointed him as Prime Minister on 7 May. His new coalition government was announced on 28 May, which included seven members from the UFC, Togo's main opposition party.

Houngbo resigned on 11 July 2012, and was succeeded in office by Kwesi Ahoomey-Zunu on 23 July.

== Career within the United Nations System ==
Houngbo was a member of the United Nations Development Programme (UNDP) Strategic Management Team and was its Director of Finance and Administration before being appointed UNDP Chief of Staff in 2003. He was subsequently appointed United Nations Assistant Secretary-General, Assistant Administrator of the UNDP and Director of the UNDP's Regional Bureau for Africa by UN Secretary-General Kofi Annan on 29 December 2005.

Following his term as Prime Minister of Togo, Houngbo returned to the United Nations System in 2013 as Deputy Director-General for Field Operations and Partnership at the International Labour Office.

=== IFAD, 2017–2022 ===
In 2017 Houngbo was appointed President of the International Fund for Agricultural Development (IFAD). In 2020 he was also appointed by UN Secretary-General António Guterres to serve on the Advisory Committee for the 2021 Food Systems Summit, chaired by Inger Andersen.

=== International Labour Organization, 2022–present ===
On 25 March 2022 Houngbo was elected to succeed Guy Ryder as Director-General of the International Labour Organization (ILO), becoming the first African selected for the position. His term began on 1 October 2022. Since 2023, he has been an ex-officio member of the United Nations High-level Panel on the Teaching Profession, co-chaired by Kersti Kaljulaid and Paula-Mae Weekes. Houngbo's re-election took place on 16 November 2026.

== Personal life ==
Houngbo is married and has three children. The two eldest children live in Canada.

== See also ==
- Faure Gnassingbe
- Kwesi Ahoomey-Zunu
- Victoire Tomegah Dogbé
- Komi Selom Klassou
- Cina Lawson

Positions in intergovernmental organisations
Preceded by Guy Ryder	Director-General of the International Labour Organization; 2022−present	Succeeded by Incumbent

Political offices
Preceded by Komlan Mally	Prime Minister of Togo; 2008–2012	Succeeded by Kwesi Ahoomey-Zunu
