= Council of Ministers (Bhutan) =

National cabinet

The Council of Ministers (Dzongkha: ལྷན་རྒྱས་གཞུང་ཚོགས་; Wylie: lhan-rgyas gzhung-tshogs) is the highest executive body in Bhutan. It was created in 1999 by Jigme Singye Wangchuck, the fourth King of Bhutan.

== History of the Lhengye Zhungtshog ==
Until 1999, Bhutan's Cabinet consisted of a council of Ministers chaired by King Jigme Singye Wangchuck. In 1999, as a major step toward democratization, the King dissolved the existing cabinet and withdrew from his role in the decision-making in the cabinet. Six new ministers were nominated, placed before the National Assembly, and voted in as new ministers. The term Council of Cabinet Ministers, or "CCM," was thus born. From this group of six ministers, a chairman was selected. The selection was based on the number of "yes" votes received during the National Assembly vote. The role of Chairman rotated among members, each minister enjoying the honour for a period of one year.

On July 26, 1999, the National Assembly enacted the Lhengye Zhungtsho Act on advice of the King. This represents the first codification of the modern Lhengye Zhungtshog. Under the act, executive power is fully devolved to the new Lhengye Zhungtshog. Initially, the body lacked a Prime Minister, but was headed by a Chair; later, this position was eliminated in favor of the office of Prime Minister. The Lhengye Zhungtshog was also composed differently from in later years: it consisted of elected Ministers, members of the Royal Advisory Council and the Kalyon. Elected Ministers must have been natural born citizens of Bhutan, must not have been married to a foreign national, and must have already held senior government posts at the rank of Secretary to the Royal Government or above. Candidates were nominated by the King and elected indirectly through the National Assembly. Under the first incarnation of the Lhengye Zhungtshog, as under the "CCM," Ministers continued to enjoy five-year terms while the Chair rotated among them on a yearly basis.

== Modern Lhengye Zhungtshog ==
Under Article 20 of the Constitution of Bhutan, executive power is vested in the Lhengye Zhungtshog, consisting of the Ministers headed by the prime minister. The number of Ministers is determined by the number of Ministries required to provide efficient and good governance. Creation of an additional ministry or reduction of any ministry must be approved by Parliament. The Lhengye Zhungtshog must aid and advise the King in the exercise of His functions including international affairs, provided that the King may require the Lhengye Zhungtshog to reconsider such advice. The Prime Minister must keep the King informed from time to time about the affairs of the State, including international affairs, and must submit such information and files as called for by the King.

The Lhengye Zhungtshog must assess the state of affairs arising from developments in the State and society and from events at home and abroad; define the goals of State action and determine the resources required to achieve them; plan and co-ordinate government policies and ensure their implementation; and represent the Kingdom at home and abroad. The Lhengye Zhungtshog are collectively responsible to the King and to Parliament. The Executive cannot issue any executive order, circular, rule or notification inconsistent with, modifying, varying or superseding the laws of Bhutan.

Presently, the council has 10 members who are termed as Lyonpos and wear a ceremonial orange scarf. The prime minister, who is the head of the government, is directly elected by the people through two rounds of national elections every five years. Democratic elections were first held in 2008. The latest elections were held in 2018. The present prime minister of Bhutan is Lyonchen Dr. Lotay Tshering who will be serving for a term of five years.

== The Ministries ==
The Ministry of Agriculture and Livestock is responsible for:

- Department of Agriculture
- Department of Forests and Park Services
- Department of Livestock
- Department of Agricultural Marketing and Cooperatives
- Bhutan Agriculture and Food Regulatory Authority
- National Biodiversity Center
- Rural Development Training Centre

State Owned Enterprises (SOEs) affiliated to MoAF are:

- Green Bhutan Corporation Limited
- Farm Machinery Corporation Limited
- Bhutan Livestock Development Corporation Limited

The Ministry of Education and Skills Development is responsible for:

- Department of Adult and Higher Education
- Department of School Education
- Department of Youth, Culture and Sports

The Ministry of Finance is responsible for:

- Department of Aid and Debt Management
- Department of National Budget
- Department of National Properties
- Department of Public Accounts
- Department of Revenue and Customs
- Department of Macro Economics

Previous ministers:
- Lyonpo Chogyal (May 1968 – 1988)
- Lyonpo Dorji Tshering (1988 – 1998)
- Lyonpo Yeshey Zimba (August 1998 – July 2003)
- Lyonpo Wangdi Norbu (July 2003 – July 2007) (April 2008 – May 2013)

The Ministry of Foreign Affairs and External Trade is responsible for:

- Department of Bilateral Affairs
- Department of Multilateral Affairs
- Department of Protocol

The Ministry of Health is responsible for:

- Department of Public Health
- Department of Public Services
- Department of Medical Supplies and Health Infrastructures
- Department of Traditional Medicine
- Directorate of Services

The Ministry of Home Affairs is responsible for:

- Bureau of Law and Order
- Department of Civil Registration and Census
- Department of Culture and Heritage
- Department of Immigration
- Department of Local Governance Previous ministers:
- Lyonpo Tamji Jagar (1968 – 1985)
- HRH Namgyal Wangchuk (1985 – 1991)
- Lyonpo Dago Tshering (1991 – June 1998)
- Lyonpo Thinley Gyamtsho (July 1998 – August 2003)
- Lyonpo Jigmi Y. Thinley (August 2003 – July 2007)

The Ministry of Industry, Commerce and Employment is responsible for:

- Department of Trade
- Department of Industry
- Department of Intellectual Property
- Department of Geology and Mines
- Department of Hydro-Met Services
- Department of Renewable Energy
- Department of Hydropower & Power Systems
- Department of Cottage & Small Industry
- Office of Consumer Protection

The Ministry of Infrastructure and Transport is responsible for:

- Department of Roads
- Department of Urban Development & Engineering Serv
- Department of Urban Development and Eng. Services
- Standard and Quality Control Authority

Previous Ministers:
- Lyonpo Ugyen Tshering
- Lyonpo Kinzang Dorji

The Ministry of Energy and Natural Resources is responsible for:

== Former cabinets ==
=== Tshering Tobgay's cabinet ===
Minister	Name
Prime Minister	Lyonchhen Tshering Tobgay
Minister of Agriculture & Forest	Lyonpo Yeshey Dorji
Minister of Economic Affairs	Lyonpo Lekey Dorji
Minister of Education	Lyonpo Norbu Wangchuk
Minister of Finance	Lyonpo Namgay Dorji
Minister of Foreign Affairs	Lyonpo Damcho Dorji
Minister of Home and Cultural Affairs	Lyonpo Dawa Gyeltshen
Minister of Health	Lyonpo Tandin Wangchuk
Minister of Information and Communications	Lyonpo Dina Nath Dhungyel
Minister of Labour and Human Resources	Lyonpo Ngeema Sangay Tshempo
Minister of Works and Human Settlement	Lyonpo Dorji Choden

== Current cabinet ==
Minister	Name
Prime Minister	Lyonchhen Dasho Tshering Tobgay
Minister for Foreign Affairs and External Trade	Lyonpo D N Dhungyel
Minister for Home Affairs	Lyonpo Lungten Dorji
Minister for Agriculture and Livestock	Lyonpo Younten Phuntsho
Minister for Health	Lyonpo Tandin Wangchuk
Minister for Industry, Commerce and Employment	Lyonpo Namgyal Dorji
Minister for Finance	Lyonpo Lekey Dorji
Minister for Infrastructure and Transport	Lyonpo Chandra Gurung
Minister for Education and Skills Development	Lyonpo Dimple Thapa
Minister for Energy and Natural Resources	Lyonpo Sonam Tashi

== See also ==
- List of prime ministers of Bhutan
- Politics of Bhutan
- Constitution of Bhutan
- Bhutanese legislation
