= Jai Bir Rai =

Bhutanese politician

Lyonpo Jai Bir Rai
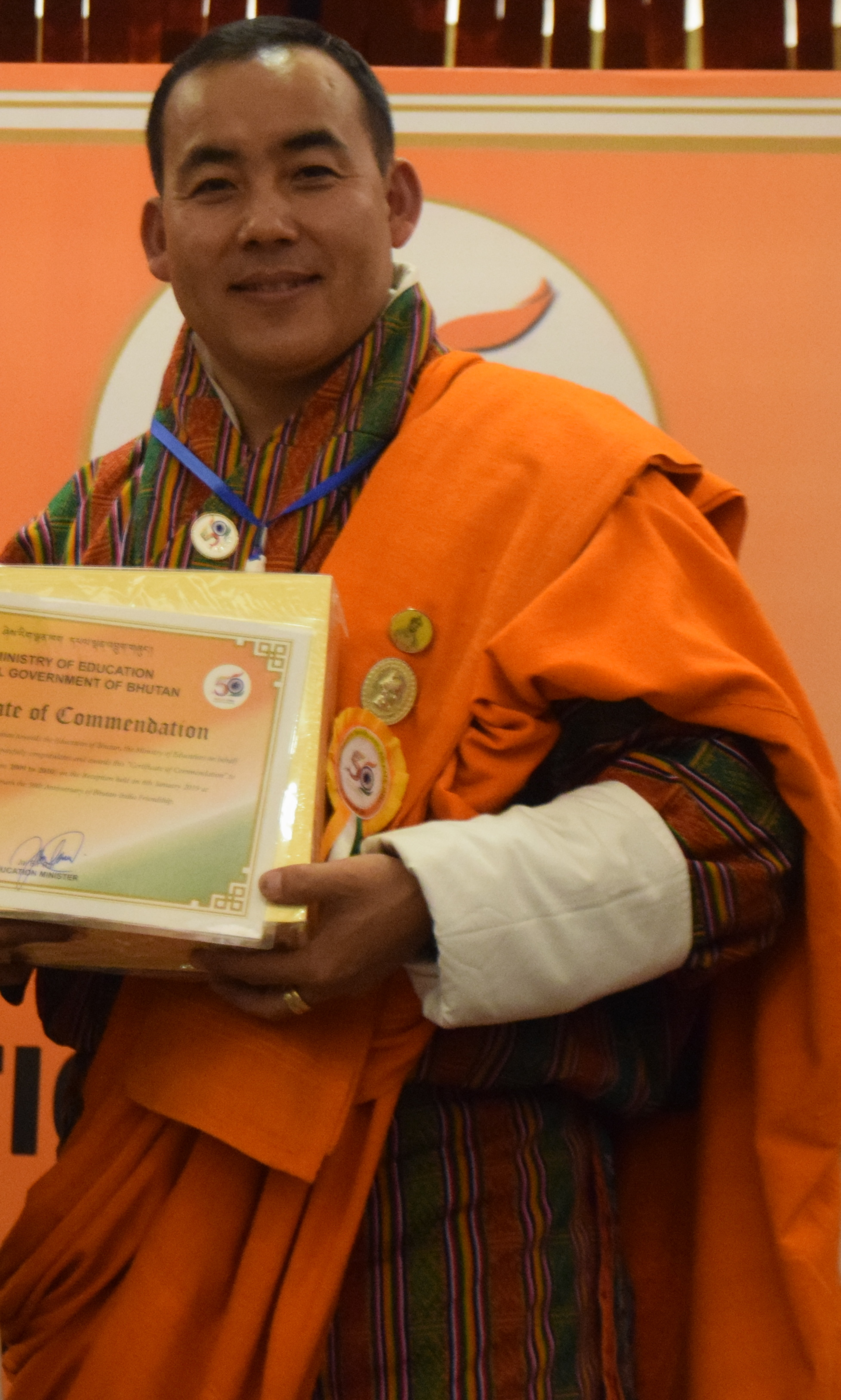

Minister for Education
- In office 7 November 2018 – 2023
- Prime Minister: Lotay Tshering
- Preceded by: Norbu Wangchuk
- Succeeded by: Dimple Thapa

Member of the National Assembly of Bhutan
- Incumbent
- Assumed office 31 October 2018
- Preceded by: Rinzin Dorji
- Constituency: Phuentsholing

Personal details
- Born: c. 1973
- Party: Druk Nyamrup Tshogpa
- Education: Maastricht School of Management

Jai Bir Rai (c. 1973) is a Bhutanese politician who has been Minister for Education since November 2018. He has been a member of the National Assembly of Bhutan, since October 2018.

== Early life and education ==
Rai was born on c. 1973.

He graduated from the Maastricht School of Management, the Netherlands, and received an MBA (Research program, specialized in Accounting and Finance).

== Professional career ==
Before joining politics in 2013, he served as a CEO, chief consultant, trainer and was also the finance officer of the Royal University of Bhutan, JDWNRH and the Ministry of Agriculture.

== Political career ==
Rai is a member of Druk Nyamrup Tshogpa (DNT). He was elected to the National Assembly of Bhutan in the 2018 elections for the Phuentsholing constituency. He received 5,586 votes and defeated Tashi, a candidate of Druk Phuensum Tshogpa.

On 3 November, Lotay Tshering formally announced his cabinet structure and Rai was named as Minister for Education. On 7 November 2018, he was sworn in as Minister for Education in the cabinet of Prime Minister Lotay Tshering.

Political offices
Preceded by Norbu Wangchuk	Minister for Education; 2018–present	Incumbent
