= COVID-19 pandemic in Bhutan =

Ongoing COVID-19 viral pandemic in Bhutan

- Disease: COVID-19
- Pathogen: SARS-CoV-2
- Location: Bhutan
- First outbreak: Wuhan, Hubei, China
- Index case: Paro
- Arrival date: 6 March 2020 (6 years, 5 months, 2 weeks and 2 days)
- Confirmed cases: 62,961
- Deaths: 21
- Vaccinations: 699,116 (total vaccinated); 677,669 (fully vaccinated); 2,011,426 (doses administered)

Government website
- https://www.gov.bt/covid19/

The COVID-19 pandemic in Bhutan was a part of the worldwide pandemic of coronavirus disease 2019 (COVID-19) caused by severe acute respiratory syndrome coronavirus 2 (SARS-CoV-2).

The virus was confirmed to have reached Bhutan on 6 March 2020, when a 76-year-old American tourist who had travelled from India tested positive for COVID-19.

The King of Bhutan addressed the nation on 22 March 2020, telling citizens "As a small country with a small population, we can overcome any challenge we are faced with, if the people and the government work together."

The country subsequently implemented strict containment measures, and was able to largely stamp out the outbreak. Bhutan currently has the lowest case fatality rate for COVID-19 at 0.05%, which is significantly lower than the WHO's global case fatality rate of 4.34%, and lower than SARS of 2003. However, the transmission has been significantly greater.

== Background ==
On 12 January 2020, the World Health Organization (WHO) confirmed that a novel coronavirus was the cause of a respiratory illness in a cluster of people in Wuhan City, Hubei Province, China, which was reported to the WHO on 31 December 2019.

== The first case of COVID-19 in Bhutan: the case report ==
In Bhutan, the index case was a 76-year-old American man who had entered Bhutan as a tourist via India. During his first two days in Bhutan, he sought the medical attention for a minor illness of which the symptoms included bloating, loss of appetite, diarrhea, and fatigue. On his fourth day in Bhutan, he was diagnosed as a case of COVID-19 and was admitted at the Jigme Dorji Wangchuk National Referral hospital. Initial chest X-ray revealed mild bilateral patchy infiltrates, and he was started on oseltamivir, ceftriaxone, and doxycycline, and was kept in respiratory isolation on supplemental oxygen.

Over the days of hospitalization, the patient's oxygen requirement gradually worsened; his white blood cell (WBC) count and C-reactive protein (CRP) continued to increase. Point-of-care ultrasound revealed worsening B lines. Then the patient was put on lopinavir and ritonavir and the antibiotics were switched to meropenem and vancomycin. However, he continued to maintain a low-grade fever. Computed tomography of the chest revealed diffuse ground-glass opacities consistent with acute respiratory distress syndrome (ARDS). On the fifth day after diagnosis, the patient had to be intubated and was placed on a ventilator for respiratory support.

He also received a three-day course of 0.5 g/kg (40 g daily) of intravenous immunoglobulin (IVIG) and underwent prone positioning for ARDS. By the next morning, his oxygenation status improved, and 48 hours after the first dose of IVIG, the patient's WBC count and CRP had decreased. The patient was evacuated to his home country after eight days of treatment and significant clinical improvement in Bhutan. His recovery went well, and was extubated seven days after evacuation. Fifteen days after his diagnosis, he no longer required oxygen therapy and rehabilitative therapy was initiated.

== Timeline ==
Cases

Deaths

=== March 2020 ===
6 March: Bhutan confirmed its first COVID-19 case, a 76-year-old U.S. male who travelled to the country via India. Around 90 people who came directly in contact with him, along with his 59-year-old partner, driver, and guide were promptly traced and quarantined.

Bhutan immediately restricted entry of foreign tourists for two weeks. Schools in three areas including the capital Thimphu were closed.

The 76-year-old American male's case received personal attention from Bhutan's king, and he was evacuated to the United States on 13 March. He was evacuated to Baltimore, MD, and survived. His partner also survived.

20 March: The 59-year old partner of the American tourist tested positive for COVID-19 14 days into quarantine, 19 days after entering Bhutan, and 28 days after her first contact with the index case. Although their driver and guide tested negative, both were being held in extended quarantine even though their quarantine period had ended.

22 March: Jigme Khesar Namgyel Wangchuck, the king of Bhutan, announced in a national address that the country's land borders would be sealed off.

23 March: All International borders were sealed. Around 5,000 Bhutanese living the Indian town of Jaigaon West Bengal, bordering Bhutan, were evacuated to neighbouring Phuntsholing.

24 March: The government banned the import of Doma (betel nut) and Pani (betel leaf), as well as fruit, vegetables, and meat in an effort to curb the spread of the coronavirus. It also closed all its borders with India.

25 March: A student in Bhutan who had returned from the United Kingdom was found to be positive for COVID-19, the third case in the country.

29 March: According to the Ministry of Health, a returning student in the quarantine facility tested positive. The patient was moved to the isolation ward in Thimphu. This is the 4th positive case in Bhutan and the 2nd Bhutanese to be infected by COVID-19 in the country. A Bhutanese national in New York was also confirmed positive.

31 March: The Prime Minister, Dr. Lotay Tshering, announced that the quarantine period for COVID-19 in Bhutan will be extended from 14 to 21 days, even though the international (WHO) standard for quarantine is 14 days. He said: "There is the risk of testing positive even after quarantining for 14 days. That is why we have decided to extend the quarantine period." On this date, Bhutan had 3,059 people held in quarantine facilities and 339 people in home quarantine.

=== April 2020 ===
1 April: It was announced that a Bhutanese student who had been studying in the US, and was under facility quarantine in Thimphu, has tested positive for Coronavirus. She has been moved to the isolation centre and is reported to be in a stable condition. This is the 5th case of COVID-19 detected in the country.

2 April: It was announced that the first two COVID-19 cases detected in Bhutan (an American tourist and his travelling partner) have now recovered.

7 April: With the numbers of coronavirus infections in neighbouring India rising, increased security and prevention measures have been set up in the Sarpang and Samtse districts which border the Indian states of Assam and West Bengal. These measures include round-the-clock surveillance of all formal and informal border crossing points, and door-to-door COVID-19 awareness and prevention campaigns.

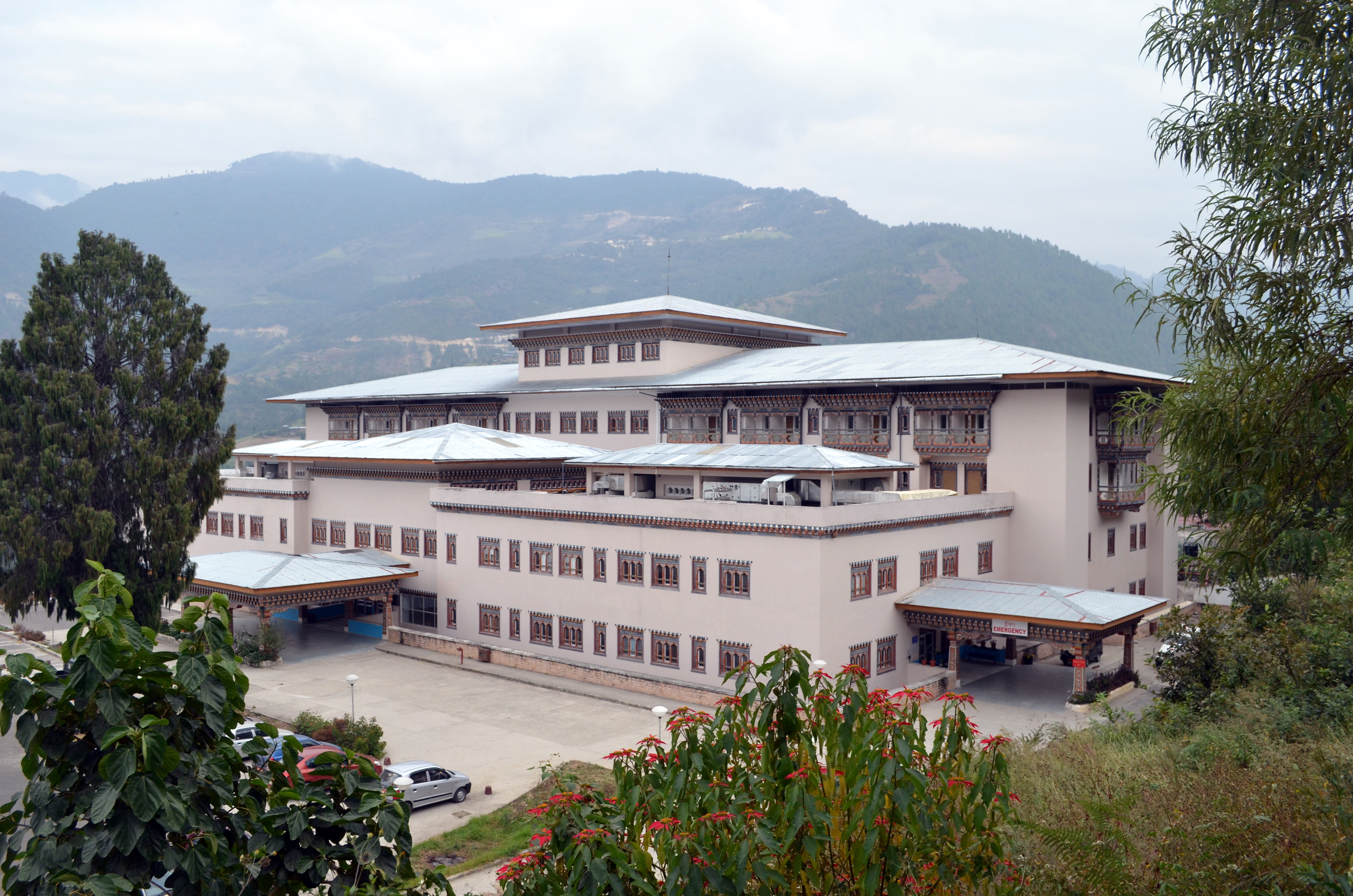
Regional Referral Hospital, Mongar

8 April: A special isolation hospital equipped to treat any COVID-19 patients in the eastern region has been set up in the Royal Guest House at Mongar. It has 24 beds with a surge capacity for an additional 15 beds. A COVID-19 testing lab was also set up at the Mongar Regional Referral Hospital and, until this date, seven suspected cases had been tested there. All these test results were negative. The Mongar District administration has also identified 30 quarantine centres in the district. Currently only one person in the district is in quarantine.

9 April: 309 Bhutanese were evacuated from the Maldives and New Delhi in India and returned to Bhutan by special Drukair flights. On arrival they were all sent directly to the quarantine facility in Thimphu. Most of those returning from the Maldives had been working in the tourism sector there; while the majority of those returning from New Delhi were students. The government scheduled further flights within the following days to evacuate Bhutanese residing in Bangalore, Amritsar and Chandigarh In India, and those residing in Sri Lanka.

20 April: The second COVID-19 case, the 59 year-old partner of the first patient, left the country on 20 April after making a full recovery. On that day, 1,400 people were in 75 facility quarantine centres and two in home quarantine. More than 3,500 had already been discharged after completing their quarantine period.

21 April: A person who returned to Bhutan from the Middle East, in quarantine since arrival, tested positive and became the sixth COVID-19 case in the country; he was moved to the hospital isolation facility. The other three COVID-19 patients were in stable condition and were now in de-isolation.

22 April:A 24-year-old man who returned from the Middle East tested positive, taking the number of confirmed cases in the country to seven. The man was under quarantine at Paro and on testing positive, moved to the isolation ward in Thimphu.

23 April The fourth COVID-19 case in the country was declared recovered and sent home. The three remaining cases were all in de-isolation quarantine having already tested negative twice in 24 hours.

27 April: The first Bhutanese (third case in the country) COVID-19 case in the country had now recovered after completing the 14-day de-isolation period since first testing negative. The individual tested negative again after finishing the 14-day de-isolation period in quarantine.

"The Royal Government of Bhutan and the World Bank today signed a fast-track $5 million COVID-19 Emergency Response and Health Systems Preparedness Project to help Bhutan prevent, detect, and respond to the COVID-19 pandemic and strengthen its public health preparedness. The agreement was signed by Finance Minister Lyonpo Namgay Tshering and Tenzin Lhaden, Acting Country Representative, on behalf of the World Bank."

=== May 2020 ===
1 May: The Foreign Minister reported that a 36-year old Bhutanese in Abu Dhabi tested positive yesterday. There are now 12 Bhutanese citizen living abroad who are positive, five of whom have recovered.

2 May: Suspected case: it was reported that a businessman in Jomotsangkha in the Samdrup Jongkhar district of South Eastern Bhutan had tested positive on 1 May for COVID-19 using a rapid test kit, when a team from the Ministry of Health was conducting random sampling tests there. A further sample was sent to a national testing centres unit at Mongar to confirm the result. The person, who was asymptomatic and had no recent travel history, was placed in quarantine to be moved to an isolation ward in Mongar or Thimphu if the further test result proved positive. Contract tracing of this suspected community transmission case was carried out, and about 1,000 people instructed to stay indoors pending the PCR test results of this case. About 60 other people in the same town were tested as part of high-risk community surveillance. Jomotsangkha, which borders India, is considered a high-risk community as the town currently has no internal road connection with the rest of Bhutan and people normally need to travel via Assam to reach other places in Bhutan.

Later in the day, it was announced that the PCR test results of the suspected case in Jomotsangkha were negative. The Prime Minister, Dr. Lotay Tshering, said the previous rapid test was positive for IgM, which means he could have an active viral infection, but was not shedding the virus at the time of the PCR test. The area continues to be kept under high surveillance, with the suspected case and his primary contacts put under isolation or quarantine for at least seven days. The prime minister said the situation would be reviewed only after a second PCR test revealed the suspected case to be negative once more.

7 May: To date, about 11,000 people have been tested for COVID-19 within the country. About 9,000 by rapid tests and 2,400 by PCR tests. Over 4,300 have been discharged from quarantine facilities and about 1,500 remain in quarantine.

8 May: The sixth COVID-19 case, detected 21 April after returning from the Middle East, now tested negative twice by RT-PCR test on 6 May, and was moved from hospital to de-isolation quarantine in a hotel facility in accordance with Bhutan's COVID-19 guidelines. She would only be declared recovered after completing 14 days of de-isolation quarantine and testing negative again at the end of that period. One COVID-19 patient remained in isolation ward at JDWRH hospital.

10 May: Two Bhutanese returning from the Middle East who were in a quarantine facility at Paro tested positive for COVID-19 and been moved to an isolation ward.

11 May: Two Bhutanese returning from the Middle East (a 25-year-old male and a 27-year-old female) tested positive for COVID-19. They were in a quarantine facility and have been be moved to an isolation ward.

13 May: Four Bhutanese (2 males, 33 and 32 years old; and 2 females 23 and 26 years old), who returned from the Middle East and were being held in quarantine in Thimphu, have tested positive for COVID-19 by PCR test and will be transferred to the isolation ward for COVID-19 patients at the national referral hospital.

14 May: Five more COVID-19 positive cases were detected. Four of the new cases were women 31, 29, 24, and 27 years old. They had all returned to Bhutan from the Middle East and were in the quarantine facilities at Thimphu and will be moved to the isolation facility.

15 May: One more case of COVID-19 was detected in a 29-year-old woman who had returned from Doha, Qatar and was staying in the quarantine facility at Thimphu.

21 May: Three individuals confirmed with COVID-19 who were under isolation had now tested negative twice (24 hours apart) and so, had been moved to 14-day de-isolation quarantine.

22 May: Two women who returned from the Middle East on 11 May and were in quarantine have now tested positive for COVID-19. The Health Minister, Dechen Wangmo, said that one of the women earlier showed symptoms of the virus but tested negative at that time. When a second test was conducted, which is the normal procedure, the virus was detected.

Of the 23 cases so far in Bhutan, 7 were male and 16 were female. 17 cases were considered active cases, while six had recovered. To this date, 6,488 people had been quarantined, with 863 individuals still in quarantine.

Later in the day, a third person in quarantine also tested positive bringing the total cases to 24 and active cases to 18.

24 May: Three more Bhutanese, all returned from the middle east and held in quarantine, tested positive today, 2 males 23 and 29 years old and one female 29 years old. Two were in a quarantine facility in Thimphu and one at Paro. They will all be moved to the COVID-19 isolation ward at JDWNRH today.

25 May: The Republic of Korea provided grant aid of US$400,000 to the Ministry of Health today. Out of the total grant, US$200,000 was used to procure test kits which can conduct 17,250 tests. The other half of the grant would be used to support COVID-19 response measures. The test kits were handed over by the Korea International Cooperation Agency (KOICA) in Bhutan to the Ministry of Health this morning. Based on experience in Korea, KOICA said mass testing could support Bhutan in managing and preventing the spread of COVID-19 effectively.

26 May: As the Government of India had allowed resumption of domestic air travel from 25 May and train services from 1 June, Bhutanese in India who wished to return to the country could now take Indian domestic flights to Bagdogra or Guwahati and trains to New Jalpaiguri and Alipurduar. Upon arrival in Bhutan, they would have to report to the relevant COVID-19 task force for the mandatory 21-day quarantine.

27 May: A Bhutanese woman who returned from New Delhi, and was quarantined in Phuntsholing, tested positive for COVID-19.

28 May: Three people (2 females and 1 male) in quarantine have tested positive today and will be moved to into the JDWNRH isolation ward in the evening. This week five more people (4 females and 1 male) who were in the isolation ward have tested negative and have been moved to the de-isolation quarantine facility. As of now 14 people who were in the JDWNRH isolation ward are now in de-isolation after testing negative.

30 May: 10 new positive cases detected in the last 24 hours, 7 female and 3 male all returned from the Middle East. The total cases reported in the country so far now stands at 43. The government has asked the public not to be alarmed about the recent spike in cases since all cases detected to date are imported, and all individuals coming into Bhutan are kept under mandatory quarantine for 21 days. They say standards and protocols are in place to ensure that every individual leaving the quarantine or de-isolation facilities are free of COVID-19.

To date, Bhutan has no community transmission, and all the cases are imported including the country's first two cases detected in tourists. Most cases are detected in Bhutanese returning from the Middle East. This week more than 500 Bhutanese returned home from the Middle East, Nepal and Thailand.

=== June 2020 ===
1 June: Four more people (two male and two female) who returned from the Middle East on 29 May 2020 and entered the quarantine facilities in Thimphu tested positive for COVID-19, bringing the total number of COVID-19 cases in Bhutan to 47. Three people who completed their 2-week de-isolation periods were declared as recovered, so Bhutan now has 38 active cases of COVID-19.

4 June: One new case, a Bhutanese male returning from the Middle East, was confirmed, taking the total positive cases in the country to 48, and the total under isolation to 211. Two more individuals were declared as having recovered, taking the total recovered to 11. Both tested negative on RT-PCR upon completing their two-week de-isolation periods. Two patients were moved from an isolation ward to a de-isolation facility after testing negative twice, taking the total number of people under de-isolation to 16.

138 more Bhutanese people, including some from Qatar, Bahrain, USA, UK, Brazil, Netherlands and Italy who flew via Doha, arrived at Paro International Airport, and were all taken into quarantine.

7 June: Eleven new cases, six female and five male, were confirmed in the last 24 hours, taking the cumulative total of cases to 59. All 11 cases were detected while these people were in quarantine and are returnees from or via the Middle East. Two individuals were moved from isolation wards to de-isolation facilities after testing negative twice, taking the total number of individuals under de-isolation to 23. Three individuals were declared as having recovered after completing a two-week period of de-isolation and then testing negative on RT-PCR, taking the total cumulative figure for recoveries to 14.

10 June: Three individuals, all of whom were returned from the Middle East and were in a quarantine facility, tested positive for COVID-19, taking the cumulative total of positive cases to 62.

=== August 2020 ===
10 August: A 27-year-old woman who completed her quarantine tested positive after she moved back home, resulting in a national lockdown and contact tracing lasting as much as 72 hours all the way from Paro, Thimphu, Wangdue, Tsirang and Gelephug. However, all the primary and secondary contacts were found to be negative on RT-PCR testing.

16 August: A four year old baby daughter of a worker who worked in the mini-port in Phuntsholing tested positive for COVID-19 in the last 24 hours, bringing the total of confirmed cases to 133. The nation declared this location to be a red zone and put all borders and residence under strict surveillance. The government started to supply all groceries and foods supply through a contact point with the help of civilian personnel.

Uniquely, His Majesty Jigme Khesar Namgyel Wangchuck commanded the Royal Bhutan Army to start feeding stray animals on the streets so they would not go hungry during the current period of national lockdown.

21 August: The Border Roads Organisation Unit In Phuntsholing, 12 Defence Personnel tested positive. This created a state of panic in the area. Strict lockdown and other containment measures were introduced. The area was declared a Red Zone and any movement of unauthorised persons was strictly prohibited.

26 August: After the Phuntsholing COVID-19 rise incident, His Majesty Jigme Khesar Namgyel Wangchuck and the government announced a mass COVID-19 test by the Reverse transcription polymerase chain reaction (RT-PCR) process will take place. He said it will be introduced from 26 August 2020, in all the Indian as well as Foreign Diplomatic Units.

30 August: After mass COVID-19 testing in Bhutan, reports came in stating there were 27 more positive cases reported in Phuntsholing. A large-scale strict lockdown was implemented.

31 August: His Majesty Jigme Khesar Namgyel Wangchuck totally sealed the Indian Military Training Team and the Border Roads Organisation, as well as other foreign diplomacies, for 10 days.

=== September 2020 ===
11 September: The Royal Government of Bhutan extended the lockdown on foreign missions until 17 September 2020. Due to COVID-19 cases gradually rising, panic was created in the minds of common citizens.

=== October 2020 ===
19 October: The Government of Bhutan introduced flights from and to India and Thailand. All flights were organized and carried out by Druk Air.

=== January 2021 ===
7 January: Dechen Wangmo confirmed the first death from COVID-19 in Bhutan on this date. The victim was 34 years old and had chronic liver disease.

=== March 2021 ===
Bhutan's COVID-19 vaccination campaign began on 27 March, using AstraZeneca vaccines gifted by the Indian government. In only a single week, over 85% of Bhutan's adult population had received their first vaccine jab, a rate far faster than any other country in the world. The King of Bhutan, Jigme Khesar Namgyel Wangchuck, is reported to be waiting to be vaccinated "only after every eligible person in the country received their shots safely."

== Omicron wave ==
The first case of new severe acute respiratory syndrome coronavirus 2 (SARS-CoV-2) B.1.1.529, (Omicron) in Bhutan was reported on 14 January 2022. Since then, cases had been reported in all the 20 districts with significant increase in numbers.

== Vaccination ==
After a national vaccination campaign began on 27 March 2021, the government of Bhutan said on 9 April 2021 that 473,715 adults had received their first dose of the Oxford–AstraZeneca COVID-19 vaccine, equivalent to 60% of Bhutan's total population. A large majority of these doses were delivered at 1,200 vaccination centers in the country. Helicopters were also used to distribute vaccines to villages. By 26 April 2021, over 480,000 vaccine doses had been administered, stated the government. Second doses started to be administered on 20 July and within one week, had reached 95.6% of eligible adults.

India donated the first doses of AstraZeneca vaccine, but was unable to provide second doses due to their own severe outbreaks. Bhutan received its second consignment of 400,000 doses in March through the state-owned airline, Druk Air. Second doses were provided by other countries - USA sent 500,000 shots of Moderna, more than 400,000 AstraZeneca shots were donated by Denmark (250,000 doses), Croatia and Bulgaria, and 5000 shots of Pfizer were sent by COVAX, which comprises Gavi, the Vaccine Alliance, the World Health Organisation and the Coalition for Epidemic Preparedness Innovation, and 50,000 doses of the Sinopharm BIBP vaccine from China.

More than 3000 health workers participated in the vaccine drive and 1200 vaccination centres across the country ensured efficient delivery. They were assisted by a network of 22,000 citizen volunteers called "desuups". These ordinary citizens volunteered during the pandemic to go door to door to raise awareness, dispel misinformation, help conduct mass screening and testing and carry vaccines across the country's mountainous terrain.

Will Parks, the UNICEF representative for Bhutan, called the country "a beacon of hope to a region that is on fire."

The registration for the COVID-19 vaccination started in early March 2021. All of the Bhutanese who were above 15 years of age were eligible to register for the vaccination. However, for safety concerns, only people who were above 18 years of age got the vaccine starting 27 March 2021. Those who were below this age; those who were pregnant and lactating women and people with severe illnesses were not eligible for the vaccination. However, they will get vaccinated under careful observation.

== Impact ==
As part of its responses to the pandemic, the government created a one-year income grant to reduce the impact of a loss of income. Banks in the country moved to forgive loan interest rates for six months. The Government of Bhutan also allotted free 1GB data to all the users using Bhutanese mobile operators.

=== Agriculture ===
Farmers reported large increases in sales, as Bhutanese buy local produce because of pandemic-induced import hurdles. The vegetable market workers were providing food essentials to foreign diplomacies as well as in remote areas.

=== Education ===
All schools have been closed countrywide, leaving almost 190,000 students to attend classes online. Printed study material was distributed to students that did not have access to the Internet, in addition to radio broadcasts.

=== Tourism ===
Bhutan Airlines suspended all flights, leaving only Druk Air to provide air transport to and from Bhutan. As of 23 March 2020, only one tourist had remained in the country. Druk Air also conducted repatriation flights when directed by the Government of Bhutan.
