= List of museums in Bhutan =

Bhutan

Bhutan is home to numerous museums that showcase the rich traditions, history, culture and art and folks forms of the Bhutanese people. The museums also showcase the ancient history from over a 1500 years and also the recent history of the Wangchuck dynasty. Bhutan also has rich traditions of herbal and traditional forms of medicine that the museums highlight.

The Museums of Bhutan are mostly state run and funded. Most of the museums are spread between 3 locations: Thimphu, Paro and Trongsa.

== Museums ==
| S.No | Museum Name | Photo | City | Type | Established | Jurisdiction | Collections |
|---|---|---|---|---|---|---|---|
| 1. | Bhutan Textile Museum | - | Thimphu; 27.4666°N 89.6417°E | Specialized museum | 2001 | Ministry of Home and Cultural Affairs | Museum's priced collections are the crowns, namzas (dresses) and other accessories used by members of the kings of the Wangchuck dynasty and other members of the royal family. |
| 2 | Folk Heritage Museum | | Thimphu | Heritage center | 2001 | Ministry of Home and Cultural Affairs | Museum offers visitors a window into the lifestyle of Bhutanese villagers and their households, artifacts and items of daily use. The museum regularly organizes demonstrations of rural traditions, skills, habits and customs, household objects and tools of rural life in Bhutan. |
| 3 | National Museum of Bhutan | | Paro; 27.42873°N 89.42556°E | Heritage center | 1968 | Ministry of Home and Cultural Affairs | Housed in a 17th-century watchtower, the museum features over 3,000 artifacts across six thematic floors. Highlights include traditional weapons, farming tools, postage stamps, royal heirlooms, traditional costumes, religious relics, prehistoric tools, and sacred thangka paintings. Notable galleries include the Royal Portrait Gallery, the Chapel of the Wealth Deity, and the Tshogzhing Lhakhang (Tree of Merit), offering a comprehensive view of Bhutan’s history, monarchy, and spiritual traditions. |
| 4 | Institute of Traditional Medicine Museum | - | Thimphu 27°28′57″N 89°37′56″E | Specialized museum | 1968 | - | The institute collects, researches and dispenses traditional herbal and other non-herbal forms of medicines from many parts of the Bhutanese Himalayan region namely Lingzhi, Laya and Lunana. The institute museum showcases ingredients that include herbs, minerals and animal parts that have healing abilities. |
| 5 | Royal Heritage Museum | | Trongsa | Heritage center | 2008 | Ministry of Home and Cultural Affairs | Museum chronicles the last 100 years of Bhutan and showcases the history of monarchy in Bhutan. Ta Dzong served as a watch tower for centuries and is a five storied building. The museum has total of eleven galleries. One gallery is fully dedicated to Wangchuck dynasty, another showcases the history and significance of Trongsa Chhoetse Dzong. On display are the Namza (dress) and Raven Crown of the First Druk Gyalpo Ugyen Wangchuck. 500-year-old robes of Yongzin Ngagi Wangchuk founder of the Trongsa Dzong in the year 1543 is a prized possession. |
| 6 | Wangduechhoeling Palace | | Jakar | Heritage center | 2025 | Ministry of Home and Cultural Affairs | Bhutan’s oldest palace, Wangduechhoeling—the birthplace of the country’s first King in 1862—has been meticulously restored and transformed into a museum. |

== See also ==
- Tourism in Bhutan
- Culture of Bhutan
- National Library of Bhutan
- List of museums
