= Bhutan Food and Drug Authority =

Bhutanese drug regulatory agency

- འབྲག་བཟའ་ཆས་དང་སྨན་རིགས་དབང་འཛིན། 'brag bza' chas dang sman rigs dbang 'dzin
- Logo of the Bhutan Food and Drug Authority

Agency overview
- Formed: December 15, 2022
- Preceding agencies: Drug Regulatory Authority; Bhutan Agriculture and Food Regulatory Authority; Bhutan Narcotics Control Authority
- Jurisdiction: Government of Bhutan
- Agency executive: Gyem Bidha, Director
- Parent department: Ministry of Health
- Website: bfda.gov.bt

The Bhutan Food and Drug Authority (BFDA) (Dzongkha: འབྲག་བཟའ་ཆས་དང་སྨན་རིགས་དབང་འཛིན།; Wylie: brag bza' chas dang sman rigs dbang 'dzin) is a government agency under the Ministry of Health responsible for protecting and promoting public health through the control and regulation of food, narcotics, medicine and agricultural products.

== History ==
The BFDA was formed on December 15 2022 by the merger of the Bhutan Agriculture and Food Regulatory Authority (BAFRA), Bhutan Narcotics Control Authority (BNCA) and Drug Regulatory Authority (DRA) as per section 26 of the Bhutan Civil Service Reform Act 2022.

In the Global Food Regulators Summit 2024, the BFDA and the Food Safety and Standards Authority of India would sign an agreement where FSSAI and BFDA agreed to improving trade processes. On June 05 2025, the Central Board of Indirect Taxes and Customs issues Instruction No. 14/2025-Customs; formalizing the agreement.

== Vision ==
"Excellence in protecting and advancing the health and safety of the Nation".

== Agency mandate ==
As the successor agency of the BAFRA, BNCA and DRA, the BFDA takes the mandates of all its preceding agencies. It is mandated to enforce the provisions of the following laws:

- Plant Quarantine Act of Bhutan, 1993
- Seeds Act of Bhutan, 2000
- The Pesticides Act of Bhutan, 2000
- Livestock Act of Bhutan, 2001
- Medicines Act of Bhutan, 2003
- Food Act of Bhutan, 2005
- Tobacco Control Act of Bhutan 2010
- Biosafety Act of Bhutan 2015
- Narcotic Drugs, Psychotropic Substances and Substance Abuse Act of Bhutan, 2018
- Biodiversity Act of Bhutan, 2022
- Forest and Nature Conservation Act of Bhutan 2023

== Organizational structure ==
- Ministry of Health
  - Bhutan Food and Drug Authority
    - Director of the Bhutan Food and Drug Authority
    - Controlled Substances Division
    - Food Quality and Safety Division
    - Medical Product Division
    - Plant and Animal Biosecurity Division
    - Certification and Laboratory Services
      - Certification Services
      - National Food Test Laboratory
    - Bhutan Food and Drug Authority Board

== Director ==
- Wangdi Gyeltshen (12 November 2020 – 30 April 2023)
- Gyem Bidha (9 February 2024 – Present)

== See also ==
- Ministry of Health
- Health in Bhutan
- Agriculture in Bhutan
- Cannabis in Bhutan
