= Karma Rangdol =

Bhutanese politician

Member of the National Assembly
- In office 13 July 2013 – 1 August 2018
- Constituency: Gangzur Minjey

Personal details
- Party: Bhutan Peace and Prosperity Party (DPT)

Karma Rangdol is a Bhutanese politician who has been a Bhutan Peace and Prosperity Party (DPT) member of the National Assembly of Bhutan from 2013 to 2018. Karma Rangdol has been replaced by Dorji Tshering in 2018.
