= Institute of Traditional Medicine Services (Bhutan) =

Coordinates: 27°28′57″N 89°37′56″E

The Institute of Traditional Medicine Services is based in Thimphu, the capital of Bhutan, located on a hilltop above the Traditional Arts Center and the National Library. The institute supplies traditional medicines and medical services, trains doctors, and conducts research on traditional medicinal plants to identify the ingredients and develop new products. The institute has a library dating back to around 1616, when Tibetan Buddhism was introduced to Bhutan. The books and recipes were collected from monasteries where scholars had preserved the medical lore.

== History ==
In 1967 the king directed the Health Department of Bhutan to establish a traditional medicine system for the welfare of Bhutanese people and to preserve the Bhutanese traditional culture. An "Indigenous Dispensary" was opened on 28 June 1968 at Dechencholing, Thimphu, staffed by doctors trained in Tibet. It was moved to its present site in Thimphu in 1979 and renamed the National Indigenous Hospital, then renamed the National Institute of Traditional Medicine in 1988, and then upgraded to the Institute of Traditional Medicine Services (ITMS) in 1998. In parallel, smaller traditional medical centers have been opened across the country, and were available in all districts of Bhutan by the end of 2001. These centers are integrated into the national health service, and are attached to the district hospitals.

== Health care ==
The institute dispenses traditional medicines produced in its laboratories from minerals, animal parts, precious metals, gems and plants. Generally the patient should abstain from meat and alcohol during the medical course. Over 40,000 patients are treated annually by the institute's hospital in Thimphu. Nationwide, traditional medicine units treat over 100,000 patients a year.

== Training and research ==
The institute trains workers in traditional medicine, offering a five-year course leading to a bachelor's degree for physicians, and a three-year diploma course for the compounders who create the medicines. By 2004 the institute had produced 37 graduates and 38 diploma students, most of whom were employed in the institute.

The pharmaceutical and research unit produces the 103 essential compounds in the traditional medicine list, and directs cultivation of the medicinal plants. The unit also conducts research to authenticate species, measure effectiveness, control quality and standardize the production processes. There has been discussion about the possibility of privatizing the production unit.

== Courses ==
1. Bachelors of Science in Traditional Medicine (Drungtsho)
2. Diploma in Traditional Medicine(sMenpa)

== Museum ==
The institute museum showcases ingredients that include herbs, minerals, precious metals, gems and animal parts that have healing abilities.

== See also ==
- List of museums in Bhutan
