= Ministry of Home Affairs (Bhutan) =

Government ministry of Bhutan

Coordinates: 27°29′22″N 89°38′6″E

- ནང་སྲིད་ལྷན་ཁག། nang srid lhan khag

Ministry overview
- Jurisdiction: Government of Bhutan
- Minister responsible: Lyonpo Tshering, Minister of Home Affairs
- Website: www.moha.gov.bt

The Ministry of Home and Cultural Affairs (Dzongkha: ནང་སྲིད་ལྷན་ཁག་; Wylie: nang-srid lhan-khag; "Nangsi Lhenkhag") renamed as Ministry of Home Affairs is the government ministry within the Lhengye Zhungtshog (Council of Ministers) which oversees law and order; the civil administration; immigration services; the issuance of citizenship documents, and other related documents; the delivery of services by local governments; and the preservation, promotion, development, and protection of the culture and heritage of Bhutan. It is headed by the Home Minister (Nangsi Lyonpo), who sits on the Lhengye Zhungtshog and is led by the prime minister. The Ministry currently operates from Tashichho Dzong.

== Background ==
On May 20, 1968, the National Assembly, in its 28th session, formed a council of Ministers because of the increasing number of development activities in Bhutan. Accordingly, it resolved to appoint Lyonpo Tamji Jagar as the first Home Minister. Until 1999, this post was one among a council of Ministers appointed by the King (Druk Gyalpo). In 1999, as a major step toward democratization, King Jigme Singye Wangchuck dissolved the existing cabinet and withdrew from his role in the decision-making in the cabinet. Six new ministers, including a Home Minister, were nominated, placed before the National Assembly, and voted in as new ministers. On July 26, 1999, the National Assembly enacted the Lhengye Zhungtsho Act on advice of the King. Under this Act, candidates for the post of Home Minister were nominated by the King and elected indirectly through the National Assembly. Under the first incarnation of the Lhengye Zhungtshog, as under the "CCM," Ministers continued to enjoy five-year terms while the Chair rotated among them on a yearly basis.

In 2008, the status of the Ministry of Home and Cultural Affairs was reshaped under Article 17 and Article 20 of the Constitution of Bhutan. Executive power is wholly vested in the Lhengye Zhungtshog, consisting of the Ministers headed by the Prime Minister. The number of Ministers is determined by the number of Ministries required to provide efficient and good governance; currently the Ministry of Home and Cultural Affairs is one of ten ministries. The Home Minister, like all Ministers, is appointed from among National Assembly members by the King on advice of the Prime Minister, and must be a natural-born citizen of Bhutan. The Home Minister carries out part of the Lhengye Zhungtshog's Constitutionally mandated duty to aid, advise, and inform the King about the affairs of the State. While the Ministry of Cultural and Home Affairs, like other Ministries, may formulate and implement policy, these regulations are subordinate to laws of Bhutan.

=== List of Home Ministers ===
No.	Image	Name	Term
1		Late Lyonpo Tamzing Jagar	1968–1985
2		Prince Namgyal Wangchuk	1985–1991
3		Lyonpo Dago Tshering	1991 – June 1998
4		Lyonpo Thinley Gyamtsho	July 1998 – August 2003
5		Lyonpo Jigmi Y. Thinley	August 2003 – July 2007
6		Lyonpo Minjur Dorji	April 2008–2013
7		Lyonpo Damcho Dorji	2013–2015
8		Lyonpo Dawa Gyaltshen	2015–2018
9		Lyonpo Sherub Gyeltshen	2018–2020
10		Lyonpo Ugyen Dorji	2020–2023
11		Lyonpo Tshering	28 January 2024-

== Secretariat Divisions ==
The Bureau of Law and Order provides legal advice and guidance; facilitates prosecution; conducts research; reviews security clearance cases and verifies adverse records; and regulates explosives. It also coordinates visits by international human rights and humanitarian agencies; coordinates with the Ministry of Foreign Affairs on matters relating to transnational crimes; coordinates government level Bhutan-India meetings on border management and security; coordinates Border District meetings with Indian states of Assam and West Bengal; and liaises and coordinates on national security issues with the Royal Bhutan Police and Dzongkhag Administrations.

The Administrative and Finance Division implements the policy of the government to have a small, efficient and compact civil staff. This division is responsible for strengthening the administrative units of all the Dzongkhags (districts) and Dungkhags (sub-districts) by posting, promoting, training and transferring the administrative personnel. This division also coordinates with other government agencies to deploy other categories of personnel to the Dzongkhags.

The Policy and Planning Division works with the Planning Commission, an independent agency, to coordinate development projects within the Dzongkhags. Its Information and Communication Technology Unit (ICT Unit) maintains government websites, publications, and other online resources.

== Departments ==
The Department of Culture and Dzongkha Development has eight divisions: the Division for Cultural Properties; the Division for Conservation of Architectural Heritage Sites; the National Library; the Textile Museum; the National Museum; the Folk Heritage Museum; the Royal Academy of Performing Arts; and the Driglam Sections. The Department of Culture was previously known as the Special Commission for Cultural Affairs (SCCA), the Commission was established through a Royal Decree on July 31, 1985, with the mandate to preserve and promote Bhutan's cultural and traditional heritage. The Commission was reconstituted in 1995 as the Solzin Lhentshog with fifteen members. Following the devolution of the executive authority to the elected Lhengye Zhungtshog in June 1998, the body was reconstituted for the third time in September 1998 with 15 members for three-year terms with Lyonpo Thinley Gyamtsho as its chairman. With the third restructuring exercise of the Government Organizations, the Commission was again renamed as the National Commission for Cultural Affairs (NCCA), which later became a Department of Culture under the Ministry of Home and Cultural Affairs in on June 19, 2003.

The Department of Immigration polices illegal immigration and provides immigration services for legal residents, including naturalization and visa services. Bhutanese passports, however, are the purview of the Ministry of Foreign Affairs. The department has three divisions: the Immigration Service Division (managing Regional Immigration Offices and Paro Airport); the Inspection Division; and the Naturalization and Resident Permit Division.

The Department of Civil Registration and Census is composed of three divisions: the Civil Registration and Citizenship Services Division; the Demography and Information Division; and the Population Census Division.

The Department of Local Governance oversees and implements Bhutan's program of decentralization.

The Department of Disaster Management oversees and directs local and national governments in preparation and prevention for disasters.

== See also ==
- Ministry of Agriculture and Livestock
- Ministry of Education and Skills Development
- Ministry of Energy and Natural Resources
- Ministry of Finance
- Ministry of Foreign Affairs and External Trade
- Ministry of Health
- Ministry of Industry, Commerce and Employment
- Ministry of Infrastructure and Transport
- Lhengye Zhungtshog
- Royal Bhutan Police
- Law enforcement in Bhutan
- Law of Bhutan
- Politics of Bhutan
