= Loknath Sharma =

Bhutanese politician

Lyonpo Loknath Sharma
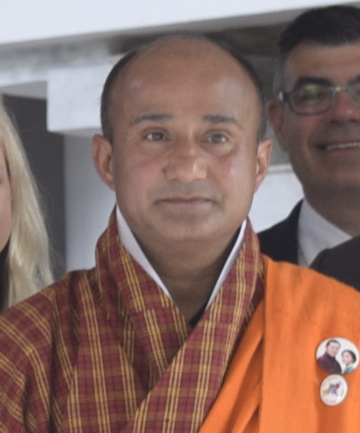
- Sharma in 2019

Minister for Economic Affairs
- Incumbent
- Assumed office 7 November 2018
- Prime Minister: Lotay Tshering
- Preceded by: Lekey Dorji

Member of the National Assembly of Bhutan
- Incumbent
- Assumed office 31 October 2018
- Preceded by: Tek Bahadur Subba
- Constituency: Dophuchen-Tading

Personal details
- Born: c. 1971
- Party: Druk Nyamrup Tshogpa
- Education: Sherubtse College; University of Allahabad; Canberra Institute of Technology

Loknath Sharma (c. 1971) is a Bhutanese politician who has been Minister for Economic Affairs since November 2018. He has been a member of the National Assembly of Bhutan, since October 2018.

== Early life and education ==
Sharma was born on c. 1971.

He received a Bachelor of Science degree from Sherubtse College, Bhutan and a Master of Arts in Economics degree from University of Allahabad, India. He completed his Advance Diploma in Community Services from the Canberra Institute of Technology, Australia.

== Professional career ==
Before joining politics, he was served as Community service worker, Economics consultant and Transport management specialist.

== Political career ==
Sharma is a member the Druk Nyamrup Tshogpa (DNT). He participated in the 2013 Bhutanese National Assembly election. He was elected to the National Assembly of Bhutan in the 2018 elections for the Dophuchen-Tading constituency. He received 5,069 votes and defeated Thakur Singh Powdyel. On 3 November, Lotay Tshering formally announced his cabinet structure and Sharma was named as Minister for Economic Affairs. On 7 November 2018, he was sworn in as Minister for Economic Affairs in the cabinet of Prime Minister Lotay Tshering.

Political offices
Preceded by Lekey Dorji	Minister for Economic Affairs; 2018–present	Incumbent
