= Tandi Dorji =

Foreign Minister for Bhutan

Lyonpo Dr. Tandi Dorji
- རྟ་མགྲིན་རྡོ་རྗེ་
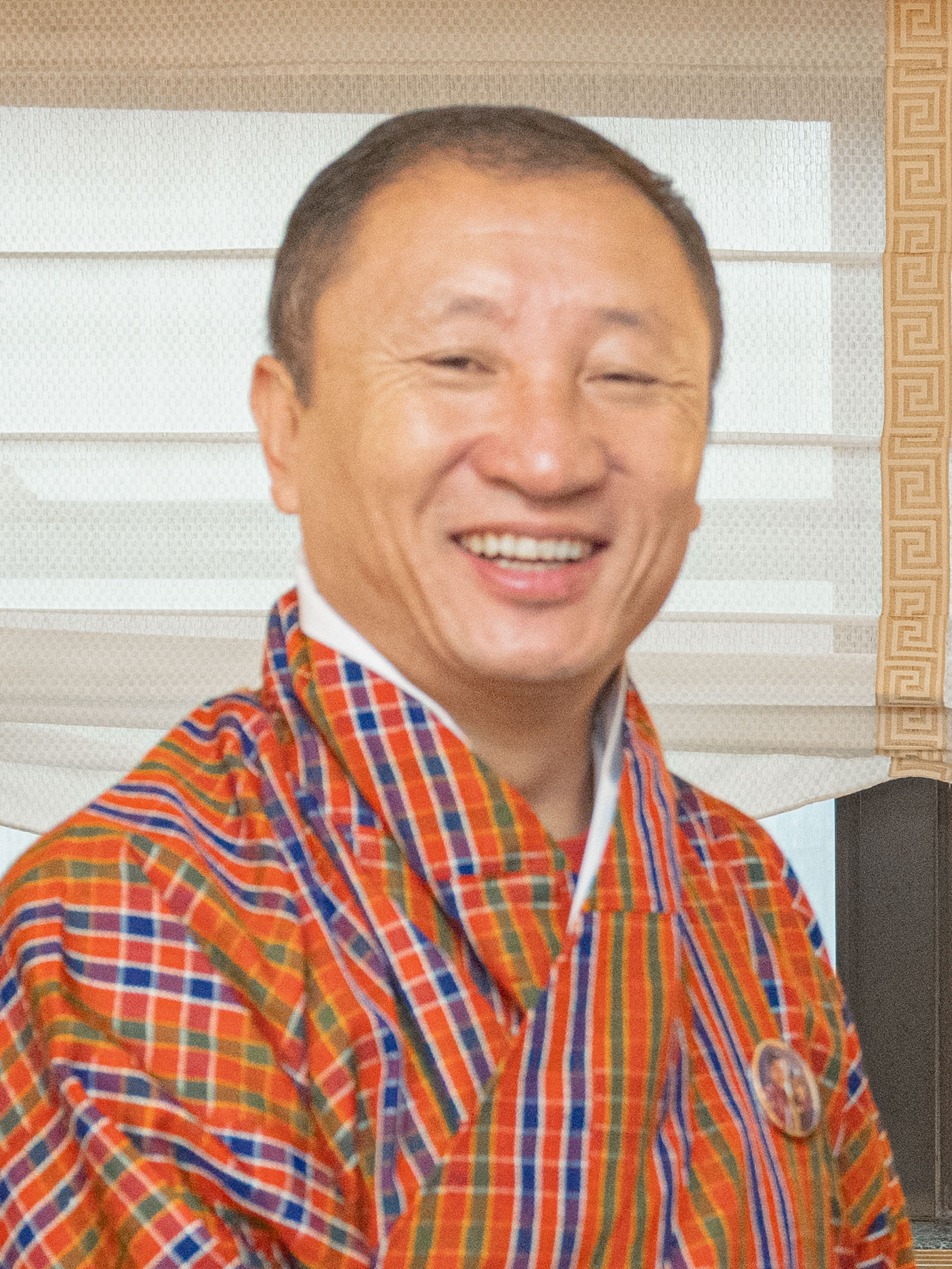
- Dorji in 2019

Foreign Minister for Bhutan
- In office 7 November 2018 – 28 January 2024
- Prime Minister: Lotay Tshering
- Preceded by: Damcho Dorji
- Succeeded by: D. N. Dhungyel

Member of the National Assembly of Bhutan
- In office 31 October 2018 – November 2023
- Preceded by: Chimi Dorji
- Succeeded by: Namgay Wangchuk
- Constituency: Lingmukha-Toedwang

Personal details
- Born: 2 September 1968 (age 58) Dawakha, Punakha
- Party: Druk Nyamrup Tshogpa
- Education: Mymensingh Medical College; University of Sydney; University of Canberra

Tandi Dorji (Dzongkha: རྟ་མགྲིན་རྡོ་རྗེ་, Wylie: rta mgrin rdo rje; born 2 September 1968) is a Bhutanese politician who served as Foreign Minister for Bhutan from November 2018 to 2024. He was a member of the National Assembly of Bhutan from October 2018 to November 2023.

== Education ==
He holds an MBBS degree from Mymensingh Medical College in Bangladesh. He undertook his residency in paediatrics from Armed Forces Medical College (AFMC) in Pune, India. He completed his Master of International Public Health from University of Sydney, Australia and Master of Business Administration from University of Canberra, Australia.

== Political career ==
Before entering politics, he was a pediatrician, public health researcher and a technical advisor.

Dorji is a founding member and former president of the Druk Nyamrup Tshogpa. He participated in the 2008 and 2013 elections. He was elected to the National Assembly of Bhutan in the 2018 elections for the Lingmukha Toedwang constituency. He received 3,154 votes and defeated Sonam Wangyel Wang, a candidate of DPT.

On 3 November, Lotay Tshering formally announced his cabinet structure and Tandi was named as Foreign Minister for Bhutan. On 7 November 2018, he was sworn in as Foreign Minister for Bhutan in the cabinet of Prime Minister Lotay Tshering.

During his time as Foreign Minister, Dorji called for climate financing and reaffirmed that Bhutan would comit to carbon neutrality. He also advocated for reforms of the UN Security Council, specifically by granting additional permanent seats for India, Japan, an African Union country, and more non-permanent countries.

In August 2025, the Druk Nyamrup Tshogpa appointed Dorji as interim president of the party.

== Honours ==
- Bhutan :
  - The Royal Orange Scarf (3 November 2018).
  - The Royal Red Scarf (17 December 2022).

Political offices
Preceded by Damcho Dorji	Foreign Minister for Bhutan; 2018–present	Incumbent
