= Wangdi Norbu =

Bhutanese politician

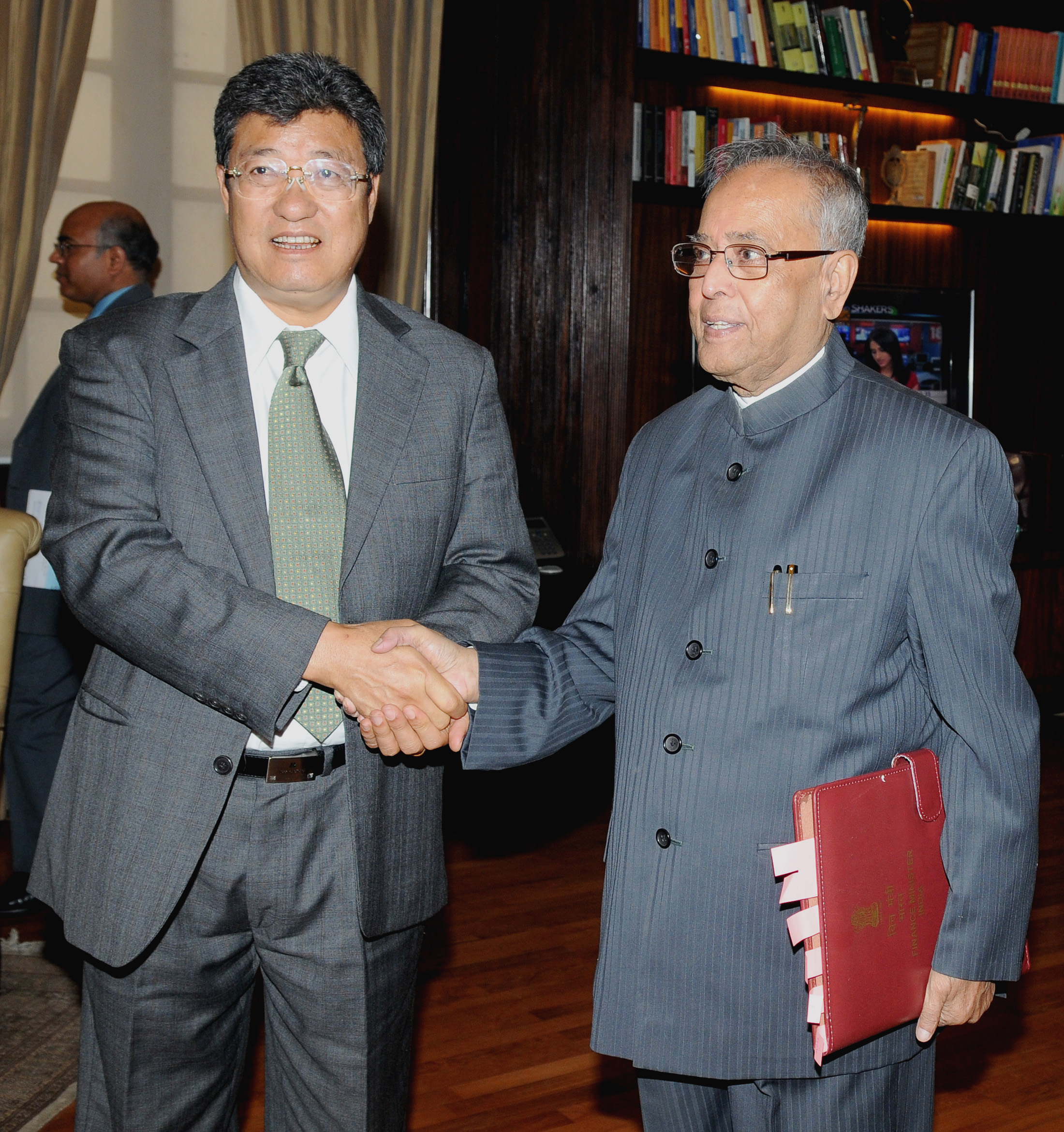
- Wangdi Norbu (left) in 2011

Minister of Finance
- In office July 2003 – May 2013
- Preceded by: Yeshey Zimba
- Succeeded by: Namgay Dorji

Member of the National Assembly
- In office 24 March 2008 – 2018
- Constituency: Bartsham Shongphu

Personal details
- Party: Bhutan Peace and Prosperity Party (DPT)
- Education: University of Western Australia

Lyonpo Wangdi Norbu is a Bhutanese politician who served as Finance Minister in the Council of Ministers from July 2003 to July 2007, and from April 2008 to May 2013. He was the chairman of Royal Monetary Authority of Bhutan from 2003 to 2007 and from 2008 to 2010.

He graduated from the University of Western Australia with a bachelor's degree in economics in 1976. He became a Bhutan Peace and Prosperity Party (DPT) member of the National Assembly of Bhutan for the constituency of Bartsham Shongphu at the country's first National Assembly election in 2008. He retained the same seat at the 2013 National Assembly election.
