= Ministry of Energy and Natural Resources (Bhutan) =

Government ministry of Bhutan

- ནུས་ཤུགས་དང་རང་བཞིན་ཐོན་སྐྱེད་ལྷན་ཁག། nus shugs dang rang bzhin thon skyed lhan khag

Ministry overview
- Jurisdiction: Government of Bhutan
- Minister responsible: Gem Tshering, Minister of Energy and Natural Resources
- Website: www.moenr.gov.bt

Ministry of Energy and Natural Resources (Dzongkha: ནུས་ཤུགས་དང་རང་བཞིན་ཐོན་སྐྱེད་ལྷན་ཁག།; Wylie: nus shugs dang rang bzhin thon skyed lhan khag) is a new ministry of Bhutan created with the enactment of the Civil Service Reform Act of Bhutan 2022. The new ministry is responsible for sustainable development of energy and natural resources while ensuring optimal contribution to national welfare.

== Background ==
The Ministry of Energy and Natural Resources was created with the enactment of the Civil Service Reform Act of Bhutan 2022 on December 30, 2022.

== Vision ==
"Sustainable development of energy and natural resources for the economic transformation of the country while ensuring environmental integrity."

== Mission ==
"Ensuring the optimal contribution to national welfare by utilizing energy and natural resources in the most efficient and environmentally-conscious manner."

== Departments ==
The Departments under Ministry of Energy and Natural Resources:

- Department of Water,
- Department of Energy,
- Department of Geology and Mines,
- Department of Forests and Park Services,
- Department of Environment and Climate Change,
- Electricity Regulatory Authority.

== Minister ==
- Lyonpo Gem Tshering (28 January 2024-present)

== See also ==
- Ministry of Agriculture and Livestock
- Ministry of Education and Skills Development
- Ministry of Finance
- Ministry of Foreign Affairs and External Trade
- Ministry of Health
- Ministry of Home Affairs
- Ministry of Industry, Commerce and Employment
- Ministry of Infrastructure and Transport
