= Ministry of Education and Skills Development (Bhutan) =

Government ministry of Bhutan

- ཤེས་རིག་དང་རིག་རྩལ་གོང་འཕེལ་ལྷན་ཁག། shes rig dang rig rtsal gong 'phel lhan khag
- Ministry of Education and Skills Development

Ministry overview
- Jurisdiction: Government of Bhutan
- Headquarters: Peling Lam, Thimphu, Bhutan
- Minister responsible: Lyonpo Yeezang De Thapa, Minister of Education and Skills Development
- Website: www.education.gov.bt

The Ministry of Education and Skills Development (MoESD) (Dzongkha: ཤེས་རིག་དང་རིག་རྩལ་གོང་འཕེལ་ལྷན་ཁག།; Wylie: shes rig dang rig rtsal gong 'phel lhan khag) is a governmental body under the Royal Government of Bhutan, responsible for formulating and implementing educational policies across the country. As of 2024, the ministry controls 566 schools.

== Vision ==
The MoESD envisions "An educated and enlightened society of Gross National Happiness (GNH), built and sustained on the unique Bhutanese values of tha dam-tsig ley gju-drey."

== Objectives ==
The Ministry's primary objectives include:

- Developing sound educational policies that enable the creation of a knowledge-based GNH society.
- Providing equitable, inclusive, and quality education and lifelong learning opportunities to all children, harnessing their full potential to become productive citizens.
- Equipping all learners with appropriate knowledge, skills, and values to cope with the challenges of the 21st century and beyond.

== Organizational Structure ==
The MoESD comprises several departments, including:

- Department of School Education
- Department of Adult and Higher Education
- Department of Youth, Culture, and Sports

== Educational Statistics ==
As of 2024, Bhutan's education system includes:

- Schools: 566 (540 government and 26 private)
- Teachers: 8,993 (8,945 government and 48 private)
- Students: 168,092 (167,997 in government schools and 95 in private schools)

== Departments ==
The Ministry of Education and Skills Development includes the following departments:

- Department of Education Programmes (DEP)
- Department of School Education (DSE)
- Department of Workforce Planning & Skills Development (DWPSD)

== Leadership ==
- Sangay Ngedup (1998–1999) (as Minister of Health and Education)
- Thakur S. Powdyel (2008–2013)
- Norbu Wangchuk (2014–2018)
- Jai Bir Rai (7 November 2018 – 2023)
- Yeezang De Thapa (28 January 2024- present)

== See also ==
- Ministry of Agriculture and Livestock
- Ministry of Energy and Natural Resources
- Ministry of Finance
- Ministry of Foreign Affairs and External Trade
- Ministry of Health
- Ministry of Home Affairs
- Ministry of Industry, Commerce and Employment
- Ministry of Infrastructure and Transport
