= Ministry of Finance (Bhutan) =

Government ministry of Bhutan

Ministry overview
- Formed: 1968; 58 years ago
- Jurisdiction: Government of Bhutan
- Headquarters: Tashichho Dzong, Thimphu
- Minister responsible: Lyonpo Lekey Dorji, Minister of Finance
- Website: www.mof.gov.bt

Ministry of Finance (Dzongkha: དངུལ་རྩིས་ལྷན་ཁག།; Wylie: dngul rtsis lhan khag) is a ministry of Bhutan is responsible to steer and sustain a robust economy through a dynamic fiscal policy and strong culture of fiscal discipline.

== History ==
The initial step towards the establishment of the Ministry of Finance was taken on July 9, 1961, during the 16th session of the National Assembly. At this Assembly, it was agreed to create an Accounts and Audit Committee known as the Gyaltse Kha Lowa in accordance with previous resolutions and decisions.

The Gyaltse Kha Lowa consisted of four members, one representative of His Majesty the King and one representative each from the Cabinet, Public and the Monk Body. The Committee was in charge of keeping government properties and revenue in good condition. Any government spending required the previous written consent of His Majesty the King, which the four committee members were to jointly maintain. His Majesty the King was to receive the Annual Accounts. The budgets for each Dzongkhag were set by His Majesty the King.

The expansion of developmental initiatives led to the appointment of two new ministers in 1968. In the 28th session of the National Assembly, on May 20, 1968, one of the new ministers, Dasho Chogyal, was named Tsilon (Finance Minister).

The Ministry of Finance assumed the duties and responsibilities of the Gyaltse Kha Lowa after a Finance Minister was appointed. After the 30th session of the National Assembly, the Ministry of Finance was also instructed to broaden its duties, starting with research on the introduction and application of different types of taxation. The job of creating an appropriate budgeting system was also assigned to the Ministry of Finance during the 33rd session of the National Assembly.

In light of these events, the Finance Ministry presented the 34th Session of the National Assembly (April 29–May 21, 1971) with the first official statement of income and expenditure of the civilian financial plan for the calendar year 1971. The Assembly confirmed and accepted the statement.

== Departments ==
The Departments under the Ministry of Finance:

- Department of Macro-fiscal and Development Finance
- Department of Planning, Budget and Performance
- Department of Procurement and Properties
- Department of Treasury and Accounts
- Department of Revenue & Customs

== Ministers ==
- Lyonpo Chogyal (20 May 1968 – 1988)
- Lyonpo Dorji Tshering (1988 – 1998)
- Lyonpo Yeshey Zimba (August 1998 – July 2003)
- Lyonpo Wangdi Norbu (July 2003 – July 2007) (April 2008 – May 2013)
- Lyonpo Namgay Dorji (July 2013 – November 2018)
- Lyonpo Namgay Tshering (7 November 2018 – January 2024)
- Lyonpo Lekey Dorji (28 January 2024 – )

== See also ==
- Ministry of Agriculture and Livestock
- Ministry of Education and Skills Development
- Ministry of Energy and Natural Resources
- Ministry of Foreign Affairs and External Trade
- Ministry of Health
- Ministry of Home Affairs
- Ministry of Industry, Commerce and Employment
- Ministry of Infrastructure and Transport
