= Yoeseltse Gewog =

Yoeseltse Gewog འོད་གསལ་རྩེ་
- Gewog
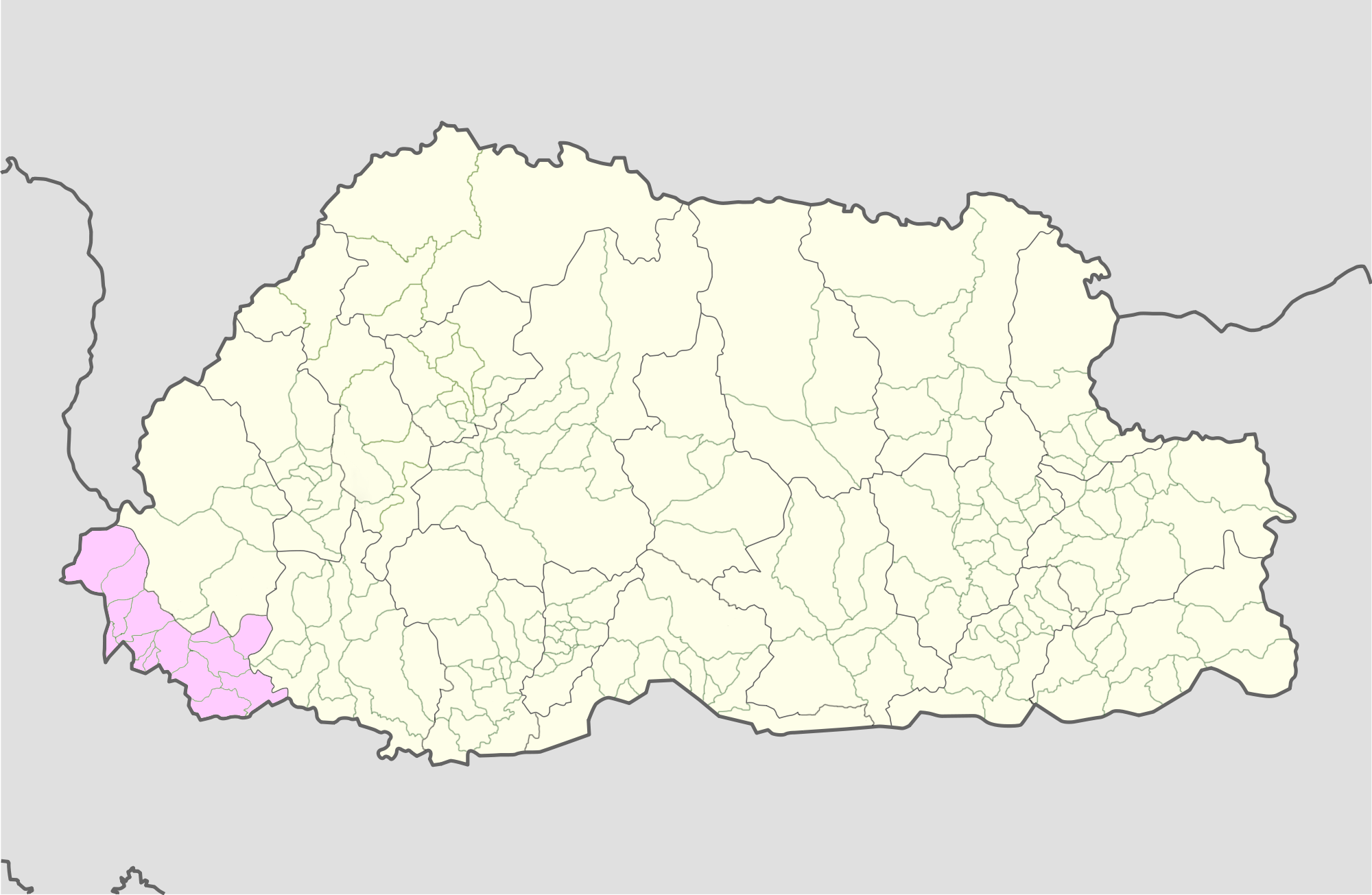
- Country: Bhutan
- District: Samtse District
- Time zone: UTC+6 (BTT)

Yoeseltse Gewog (Dzongkha: འོད་གསལ་རྩེ་) is a gewog (village block) of Samtse District, Bhutan.

The government minister Dimple Thapa comes from this gewog.
