= Nidup Zangpo =

Bhutanese politician

Member of the National Assembly of Bhutan
- In office March 2008 – 1 August 2018
- Succeeded by: Yeshey Penjor
- Constituency: Nubi Tangsibji

Personal details
- Party: Bhutan Peace and Prosperity Party (DPT)

Nidup Zangpo is a Bhutanese politician who has been a Bhutan Peace and Prosperity Party (DPT) member of the National Assembly of Bhutan from 2008 to 2018.

Zangpo gained a Bachelor's Degree in Arts and worked for the Amankora Group before being elected to the National Assembly of Bhutan in March 2008.
