= Namgay Tshering =

Bhutanese politician

Lyonpo Namgay Tshering

Minister for Finance
- Incumbent
- Assumed office 7 November 2018
- Prime Minister: Lotay Tshering
- Preceded by: Namgay Dorji

Member of the National Assembly of Bhutan
- Incumbent
- Assumed office 31 October 2018
- Preceded by: Kezang Wangmo
- Constituency: Dokar-Sharpa

Personal details
- Born: c. 1979
- Party: Druk Nyamrup Tshogpa
- Education: University of Madras; Chulalongkorn University

Lyonpo Namgay Tshering (born c. 1979) is a Bhutanese politician who has been Minister for Finance since November 2018. He has been a member of the National Assembly of Bhutan, since October 2018.

== Early life and education ==
Tshering was born c. 1979.

He received a degree of Bachelor of Science in Communication from the University of Madras, India, and a Master's degree in Public Health from Chulalongkorn University, Thailand.

== Professional career ==
Before entering politics, he served as the project coordinator (World Bank and Global Fund Project), planning officer at Ministry of Health, program manager at National HIV/AIDS control program, (2014-2018) and National professional officer at World Health Organization, (2014-2016).

== Political career ==
Tshering is a member of Druk Nyamrup Tshogpa (DNT). He was elected to the National Assembly of Bhutan in the 2018 elections for the Dokar-Sharpa constituency. He received 4,155 votes and defeated Chencho Dorji, a candidate of Druk Phuensum Tshogpa.

On 3 November, Lotay Tshering formally announced his cabinet structure, and Namgay Tshering was named as the Minister for Finance. On 7 November 2018, he was sworn in as Minister for Finance in the cabinet of Prime Minister Lotay Tshering.

Political offices
Preceded by Namgay Dorji	Minister for Finance; 2018–present	Incumbent
