= National Biodiversity Centre, Bhutan =

Bhutanese natural history museum and conservation agnecy

National Biodiversity Centre of Bhutan
- རྒྱལ་ཡོངས་སྐྱེ་ལྡན་རིགས་སྣ་ལྟེ་བ།
- Location within Bhutan
- Former name: National Biodiversity Program
- Established: 1998; 28 years ago
- Location: Serbithang; Thimphu, Bhutan
- Coordinates: 27°25′13.5156″N 89°39′6.4296″E
- Type: National museum Natural history museum Research center
- Collections: Herbarium, invertebrates, seeds, semen (cryo), living plants
- Director: Dr. Karma Dema Dorji
- Parking: On site (free)
- Website: nbc.gov.bt

The National Biodiversity Centre (NBC) was established in 1998 as the National Biodiversity Program following Bhutan’s ratification of the UN Convention on Biological Diversity (CBD) in 1995 to streamline and coordinate previously fragmented biodiversity management responsibilities. In 1999, the Royal Botanical Garden, Serbithang was launched under its purview, and in 2001, the program was formally upgraded to the NBC, operating as a non-departmental agency under the Ministry of Agriculture and Livestock (Bhutan). Legally designated under the Biodiversity Act of Bhutan 2022, the Centre serves as the central scientific and regulatory authority and the National Repository for the country's plant and animal gene banks, biological collections such as invertebrates and National Herbarium (THIM). Furthermore, the NBC is the designated National Focal Point for key international instruments, including the Nagoya Protocol on Access and Benefit Sharing (ABS), the ITPGRFA, and the CGRFA. It also acts as the Secretariat for the National Biodiversity Strategies and Action Plan (NBSAP) and the national clearing house publishing authority, overseeing data sharing and citizen-science documentation through the Bhutan Biodiversity Portal.
