= Dorji Tshering =

Bhutanese politician

Lyonpo Dorji Tshering

Minister for Works and Human Settlement
- In office 7 November 2018 – 2023
- Prime Minister: Lotay Tshering
- Preceded by: Dorji Choden
- Succeeded by: Chandra Bdr Gurung

Member of the National Assembly of Bhutan
- Incumbent
- Assumed office 31 October 2018
- Preceded by: Jigme Wangchuk
- Constituency: Radhi-Sakteng

Personal details
- Born: c. 1979
- Party: Druk Nyamrup Tshogpa
- Education: Bengal Engineering College; Edith Cowan University

Dorji Tshering (c. 1979) is a Bhutanese politician who has been Minister for Works and Human Settlement since November 2018. He has been a member of the National Assembly of Bhutan, since October 2018.

== Early life and education ==
Tshering was born c. 1979.

He received a bachelor's degree in civil engineering from Indian Institute of Engineering Science and Technology, Shibpur (Howrah) India. He completed his master's degree in civil engineering from the Edith Cowan University, Australia.

== Professional career ==
Before joining politics, he served as the executive engineer and deputy executive engineer in the Ministry of Works and Human Settlement for seven years.

== Political career ==
Tshering is a member of Druk Nyamrup Tshogpa. He was elected to the National Assembly of Bhutan in the 2018 elections for the Radhi-Sakteng constituency. He received 3,550 votes and defeated Tashi Dorji, a candidate of Druk Phuensum Tshogpa.

On 3 November, Lotay Tshering formally announced his cabinet structure and Dorji Tshering was named as Minister for Works and Human Settlement. On 7 November 2018, he was sworn in as Minister for Works and Human Settlement in the cabinet of Prime Minister Lotay Tshering.

Political offices
Preceded by Dorji Choden	Minister for Works and Human Settlement; 2018–present	Incumbent
