= Ministry of Infrastructure and Transport (Bhutan) =

Government ministry of Bhutan

- གཞི་རྟེན་མཁོ་ཆས་དང་སྐྱེལ་འདྲེན་་ལྷན་ཁག། gzhi rten mkho chas dang skyel 'dren lhan khag

Ministry overview
- Jurisdiction: Government of Bhutan
- Minister responsible: Chandra Bdr Gurung, Minister of Infrastructure and Transport
- Website: www.moit.gov.bt

Ministry of Works and Human Settlement (Dzongkha: གཞི་རྟེན་མཁོ་ཆས་དང་སྐྱེལ་འདྲེན་་ལྷན་ཁག།; Wylie: gzhi rten mkho chas dang skyel 'dren lhan khag) renamed the Ministry of Infrastructure and Transport is a ministry of Bhutan responsible for quality and sustainable infrastructure, efficient transportation services, and built environment for socio-economic well-being and happiness.

== Background ==
The Ministry of Infrastructure and Transport was established by merging the Ministry of Works and Human Settlement and Ministry of Information and Communications on December 30, 2022.

== Vision ==
"To be a dynamic organization for building quality and sustainable infrastructure, efficient transportation services, and built environment for socio-economic well-being and happiness."

== Mission ==
1. To promote safe, inclusive and well-designed human settlements
2. To develop green, sustainable, and quality infrastructure
3. To develop green and sustainable integrated transport infrastructure network and services.

== Departments ==
The Departments under Ministry of Infrastructure and Transport:

- Department of Surface Transport
- Department of Human Settlement
- Department of Infrastructure Development
- Department of Air Transport

== Minister ==
- Lyonpo Sangay Penjor (1970-1971)
- Lyonpo Dr. T. Tobgyel (1987-1992)
- Lyonpo Wogma Leki Dorji (1994-2003)
- Lyonpo Kinzang Dorji (2003 - 2008)
- Lyonpo Yeshey Zimba (11 April 2008 - 2013)
- Lyonpo Dorji Choden (2013 - 2018)
- Lyonpo Dorji Tshering (7 November 2018 - 2023)
- Lyonpo Chandra Bdr Gurung (28 January 2024-present)

== See also ==
- Ministry of Agriculture and Livestock
- Ministry of Education and Skills Development
- Ministry of Energy and Natural Resources
- Ministry of Finance
- Ministry of Foreign Affairs and External Trade
- Ministry of Health
- Ministry of Home Affairs
- Ministry of Industry, Commerce and Employment
