= Thakur S. Powdyel =

Bhutanese politician and educator

Thakur Singh Powdyel

Minister of Education
- In office 2008–2013
- Monarch: Jigme Khesar Namgyel Wangchuck
- Prime Minister: Jigme Thinley
- Succeeded by: Norbu Wangchuck

Personal details
- Awards: Coronation Gold Medal, Gusi Peace Prize for "Lifetime Contribution to Education", Global Education Award, International Award for Outstanding Contribution to Education, Institutional Award "Druk Thuksey", Dakyen

Lyonpho Thakur Singh Powdyel is a Bhutanese politician and educator of Nepali descent. He served as Minister of Education from 2008 to 2013, overseeing the Green Schools program as a part of the implementation of Gross National Happiness in Bhutan. He is currently the president of Royal Thimphu College.

== Minister of Education ==
As Minister of Education of the first elected government of Bhutan, Powdyel was an advocate for the philosophy of Gross National Happiness (GNH), and was, along with Prime Minister Jigme Thinley, instrumental in implementing GNH into the education system.. He created the program of "green schools for a green Bhutan", which are an "attempt to create GNH-based schools built on eight dimensions: Environmental greenery, Intellectual greenery, Academic greenery, Social greenery, Cultural greenery, Spiritual greenery, Aesthetic greenery, and Moral greenery". According to Powdyel, the youth of Bhutan should be "embedded with GNH values and principles" such as caring for nature, the flourishing of Bhutanese culture, and "the elements of good citizenship and governance". Powdyel believes that this would make a "successful graduate" under GNH, the criteria of which, according to the Ministry of Education, are a set of attributes "related to self, family, workplace, community and citizen".

Under the "Educating for GNH" program, many schools in Bhutan went through a week-long workshop and guidelines, modules as well as GNH clubs were set up. In December 2009, a workshop for "Educating for Gross National Happiness" was held in Thimphu, Bhutan, which, according to Powdyel, brought together "some of the finest minds from some sixteen countries engaged in holistic education, eco-literacy, indigenous knowledge, sustainable development together with some of Bhutan’s well-known educators".

According to scholar Joseph Mathew, the appointment of Powdyel as well as Minister of Information and Communications Nandalal Rai, both ethnic Nepalis, on Prime Minister Thinley's cabinet is "intended to show the international community that Nepalis in Bhutan are safe and politically empowered" despite the existence of many Nepali refugees.

== Career outside of government ==
Powdyel has been a visiting professor at the Graduate School of Asian and African Area Studies at Kyoto University, as well as the Maharishi Institute. He has also published multiple works such as As I Am, So is My Nation; Right of Vision and Occasional Views and My Green School: An Outline, the latter of which outlines the aims of the Green Schools program. He previously served as the President of the Royal Thimphu College in Thimphu.
