= Bhutan Biodiversity Portal =

App and website for sharing biodiversity observations

- Website type: Citizen science
- Available in: English
- Owner: National Biodiversity Centre, Bhutan
- Creator: Strand Life Sciences
- Website: biodiversity.bt
- Commercial: No
- Registration: required
- Users: 1719 total registered users (As of 8 March 2020
- Launched: 17 December 2013; 12 years ago
- Current status: Active
- Written in: JavaScript, Ruby, HTML

Bhutan Biodiversity Portal (འབྲུག་སྐྱེ་ལྡན་རིགས་སྣ་འཆར་སྒོ།) is a consortium based citizen science website comprising key biodiversity data generating agencies and can be used by anyone. The portal is an official online repository of data on Bhutanese biodiversity.

== History ==
Access to the updated and reliable information on the biodiversity of Bhutan for effective conservation was a major problem. The Bhutan Biodiversity Portal was created to address this issue.

In 1992 in Rio de Janeiro, a project agreement was initiated under the framework of United Nations Conference on Environment and Development which was formalized in 1994. Bhutan Integrated Biodiversity Information System(BIBIS) was created subsequently in 2002. The aim of the information system was to create a biodiversity platform which will be accessible to anyone interested in the biodiversity of Bhutan.

The BIBIS was later upgraded and developed into a web-based web portal in 2008. Since 2011 the portal have been upgraded and developed into the present form. This gave birth to the present Bhutan Biodiversity Portal. The Present portal was officially launched on 17 December 2013 coinciding with the National Day of Bhutan by the then Minister of Agriculture and Forests, Lyonpo Yeshi Dorji.

== Features ==
=== Species pages ===
The species page feature of the Portal provides curated and updated information on various taxa found in the country. Editing and creation of the species pages is limited to approved curators and admins only.

=== Observations ===
The observations feature of the Portal provides platform to the users to record observation of various taxa from within the country. This section of the Portal promotes the participation from the users to document the biodiversity of Bhutan in the form of images, audios and videos. As on 08-03-2020 the portal has a total of 64585 observations. Users can add to the observations through the contribute link in the menu. Besides the image, sound and video observations, users can add checklist, documents and datasets.

=== Maps ===
The Maps module of the Portal provides various geo-spatial information through an interactive user interface. They are displayed in the form of layers. Currently the Portal provides the following map layers.

=== Contribution ===
Contributions to the portal can be made in the following

- Adding/Editing a species page (needs special permission)
- Add an observation can be done through multiple observations
- Adding a list
- Adding documents
- Adding dataset
- Add a trait/Value
- Add a fact
- Add a data package

== Technology ==
The portal uses the opensource Biodiversity Informatics Platform codebase developed and maintained by Strand Life Sciences. The Strand Life Sciences and the India Biodiversity Portal provides all the technical backstoppings assisted by the Information and Communication Services Division under the Ministry of Agriculture and Forests.

== Platforms ==
Users of the portal can interact with the portal in various ways. They can access or contribute to the portal through:

- the web based portal accessible at https://biodiversity.bt
- Android app available on playstore
- iOS app available on appstore

== The Consortium ==
The consortium is supported by the following national and international organizations.

=== National Biodiversity Centre (Bhutan) ===
The National Biodiversity Centre, Bhutan is the secretariat for the consortium. The National Biodiversity Centre is a government institution under the Ministry of Agriculture and Forests of Bhutan.

=== Information and Communication Services Division ===
The Information and Communication Services Division under the Ministry of Agriculture and Forests was established under the Ministry in 1992. The Division currently provides technological backstopping to the Portal.

=== College of Natural Resources ===
The College of Natural Resources (Bhutan) is a college under the Royal University of Bhutan.

=== Department of Forests and Park Services ===
The Department of Forests and Park Services of Bhutan is represented by the following institutions.

==== Ugyen Wangchuck Institute for Forestry Research and Training ====
The Ugyen Wangchuck Institute for Forestry Research and Training is a research based training institute under the Department of Forests and Park Services of Bhutan.

==== Nature Conservation Division ====
The Nature Conservation Division is one of the five functional divisions under the Department of Forests and Park Services established in 1992. It currently acts as the focal of the protected areas and biodiversity conservation in Bhutan.

== Awards ==
The National Biodiversity Centre, Bhutan as the secretariat to the consortium received the Information and Communications Technology (ICT) for Mountain Development Award 2018 on the occasion of International Mountain Day on 11 December 2018.
