= Yeshey Penjor =

Bhutanese politician

Lyonpo Yeshey Penjor

Minister for Agriculture and Forests
- In office 7 November 2018 – November 2023
- Prime Minister: Lotay Tshering
- Preceded by: Yeshey Dorji
- Succeeded by: Younten Phuntsho

Member of the National Assembly of Bhutan
- In office 31 October 2018 – November 2023
- Preceded by: Nidup Zangpo
- Succeeded by: Phuntsho Dendup
- Constituency: Nubi-Tangsibji

Personal details
- Born: c. 1964
- Party: Druk Nyamrup Tshogpa
- Education: Asian Institute of Technology, Thailand Master of Science (Environment and Management)

Yeshey Penjor (c. 1964) is a Bhutanese politician who was Minister for Agriculture and Forests from 2018 to 2023. He was a member of the National Assembly of Bhutan from October 2018 to November 2024.

== Early life and education ==
Penjor was born on c. 1964.

He graduated from the Asian Institute of Technology (AIT), Thailand and received a degree of Master of Science in Environment and Management.

== Professional career ==
Before joining politics, he has served as the Project Director of Green Public Procurement Project and has served as Climate Change Policy Advisor with the United Nations Development Programme (UNDP) of Bhutan and the National Environment Commission.

== Political career ==
Penjor is a member Druk Nyamrup Tshogpa (DNT). He was elected to the National Assembly of Bhutan in the 2018 elections for the Nubi-Tangsibji constituency. On 3 November, Lotay Tshering formally announced his cabinet structure and Penjor was named as Minister for Agriculture and Forests. On 7 November 2018, he was sworn in as Minister for Agriculture and Forests in the cabinet of Prime Minister Lotay Tshering.

Political offices
Preceded by Yeshey Dorji	Minister for Agriculture and Forests; 2018–present	Incumbent
