= Ministry of Industry, Commerce and Employment (Bhutan) =

Government ministry in Bhutan

Ministry of Industry, Commerce and Employment (MoICE)
- བཟོ་གྲྭ་ཚོང་འབྲེལ་དང་ལཱ་གཡོག་ལྷན་ཁག། bzo grwa tshong 'brel dang lཱ gyog lhan khag

Agency overview
- Jurisdiction: Government of Bhutan
- Minister responsible: Namgyal Dorji, Minister of Industry, Commerce and Employment

Ministry of Economic Affairs (Dzongkha: བཟོ་གྲྭ་ཚོང་འབྲེལ་དང་ལཱ་གཡོག་ལྷན་ཁག།; Wylie: bzo grwa tshong 'brel dang lཱ gyog lhan khag) renamed the Ministry of Industry, Commerce and Employment (MoICE) is ministry of Bhutan responsible for proper management of economy, productive employment and promotion of private sectors in the country.

== History ==
On June 13, 2003, the Department of Employment and Labour and the former National Technical Training Authority (NTTA) merged to form the Ministry of Labour and Human Resources by Cabinet Order No. LZ 02/03/933.

In order to create a workforce that is both productive and skilled for the kingdom, the NTTA was founded in May 1999 with the goal of creating a system for vocational education and training (VET). It was necessary for the NTTA to organise, coordinate, regulate, support, and, where necessary, administer vocational education and training in order to accomplish its goals. Before the NTTA was established, the TVET Section of the former Ministry of Health and Education was in charge of overseeing all TVET-related operations.

The National Employment Board was established in March 2000 in response to the growing issue of youth unemployment in the late 1990s. In August 2001, it changed its name to the Department of Employment and Labour (DEL) and was incorporated under the Ministry of Health and Education. Employment promotion, labour market information, corporate and private sector human resource development, labour protection, and labour relations were the main responsibilities of the DEL.

On December 30, 2022, the Ministry of Industry, Commerce, and Employment (MoICE) was created. The Royal Civil Service Commission's (RCSC) institutional reforms included the creation of this new Ministry. The Ministry was created by combining the departments of the three previous ministries: the Ministry of Economic Affairs (MoEA), the Ministry of Information and Communication (MoIC), and the Ministry of Labour and Human Resources (MoLHR). MoICE has merged with the old MoLHR's Department of Labour and Department of Employment and Entrepreneurship. The Office of the Consumer Protection (now known as the Competition and Consumer Affairs Authority), the Department of Trade, and the Department of Industry, which were all part of the MoEA, were also transferred to the MoICE.

The MoICE now houses the Department of Tourism, which includes the former Tourism Council of Bhutan. It will serve as the secretariat for the Tourism Commission of Bhutan. Previously under the ministries of MoIC and MoEA, respectively, the Department of Information and Media and the Department of Intellectual Property were merged to form the new Department of Media, Creative Industry, and Intellectual Property under MoICE. The Bhutan InfoComm and Media Authority (BICMA) is the result of the merger of the Media Council of Bhutan and the National Film Commission. It will function as the secretariat for the Authority and be administratively under the MoICE. Likewise, the Bhutan Standards Bureau has been merged into the MoICE and will serve as the Bureau's secretariat.

== Vision ==
"To promote quality and sustained economic growth with decent and productive employment through creative and innovative interventions to promote the private sectors."

== Mission ==
"Improving the ease of doing business by establishing a responsive and coordinated regulatory framework, and integrating all business licensing systems and sectoral clearances. Promotion of FDI and integration of local industries with global value chain.

Diversification of exports in the regional and international markets through promotion of Brand Bhutan, Intellectual Property, Trade Agreements, and Mutual Recognition Instruments.

Diversification of economy through promotion of digital jobs, creativity and innovation.

Create backward and forward linkages between CSIs and medium/large industries."

== Departments ==
The Departments under the Ministry of Industry, Commerce, and Employment (MoICE):

- Department of Trade
- Department of Labour
- Department of Tourism
- Department of Industry
- Department of Employment and Entrepreneurship
- Department of Media, Creative Industry and Intellectual Property

== Minister ==
- Khandu Wangchuk (11 April 2008 - 2013)
- Norbu Wangchuk (2013-2018)
- Loknath Sharma (7 November 2018 - 2023)
- Namgyal Dorji (28 January 2024- present)

== See also ==
- Ministry of Agriculture and Livestock
- Ministry of Education and Skills Development
- Ministry of Energy and Natural Resources
- Ministry of Finance
- Ministry of Foreign Affairs and External Trade
- Ministry of Health
- Ministry of Home Affairs
- Ministry of Infrastructure and Transport
