= Ugyen Tshering =

Bhutanese politician

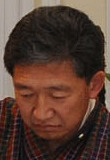
Ugyen Tshering on 22 December 2009

Lyonpo Ugyen Tshering (1954 – 29 January 2024) was a Bhutanese politician who served as minister of foreign affairs between 2008 and 2013.

He served as minister for labor and human resources before resigning in mid-2007, along with six other ministers, in order to enter politics and stand in the 2008 general election. Following the election, he became Minister for Foreign Affairs on April 11, 2008.

== Early life ==
Ugyen Tshering was born in August 1954 in a historically significant family that had served the monarch of Bhutan for generations. He studied at Saint Joseph's School, North Point, in Darjeeling. He later studied social sciences and economics at University of California, Berkeley, (1974–1978) as a Fulbright scholar.
