= Ministry of Foreign Affairs and External Trade (Bhutan) =

Government ministry of Bhutan

- ཕྱི་འབྲལ་དང་ཕྱིར་ཚོང་ལྷན་ཁག། phyi 'brel dang phyi tshong lhan khag

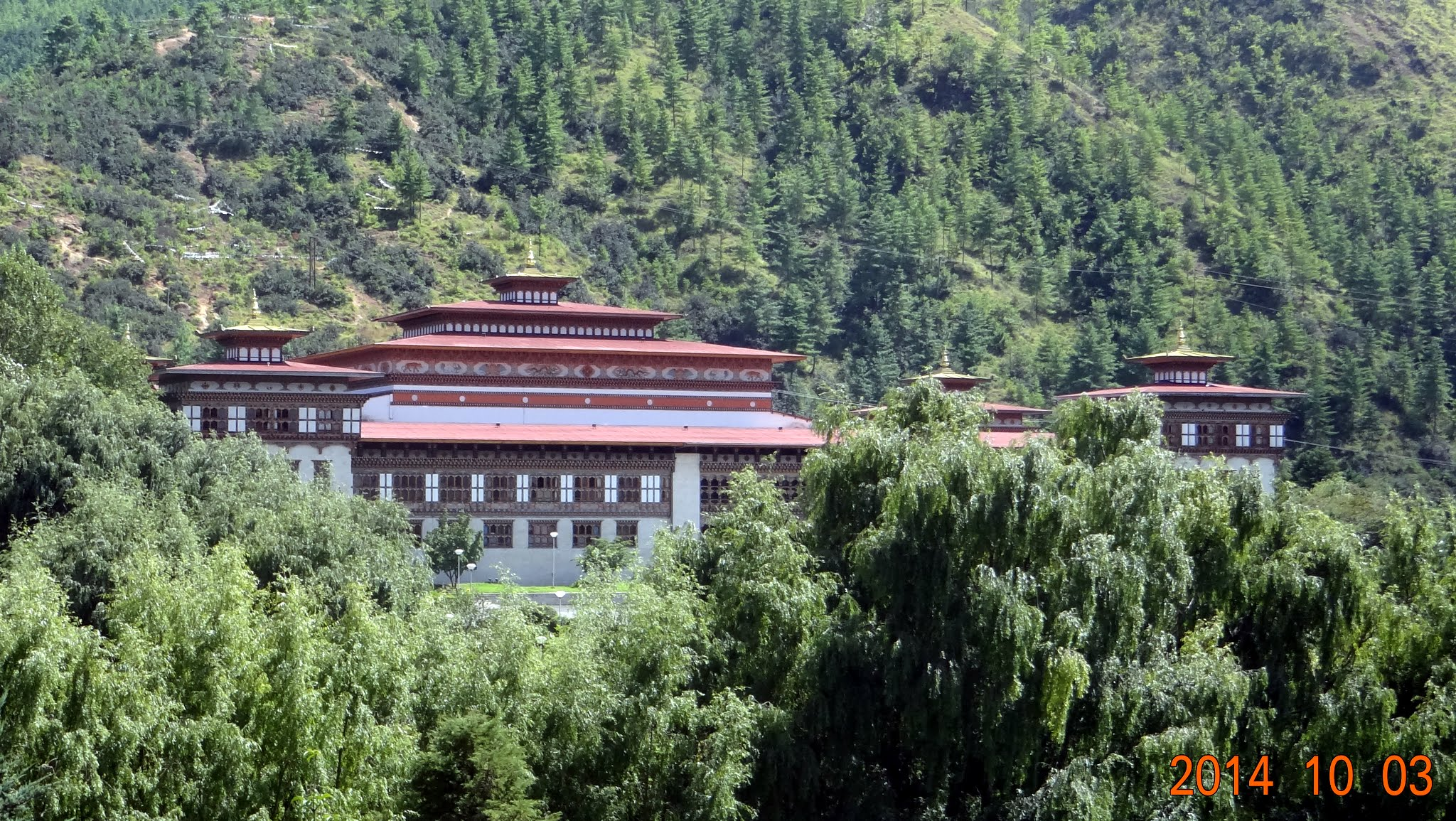

Agency overview
- Jurisdiction: Government of Bhutan
- Minister responsible: D. N. Dhungyel, Minister of Foreign Affairs and External Trade
- Website: www.mfa.gov.bt

Ministry of Foreign Affairs (Dzongkha: ཕྱི་འབྲལ་དང་ཕྱིར་ཚོང་ལྷན་ཁག; Wylie: phyi 'brel dang phyi tshong lhan khag) renamed as Ministry of Foreign Affairs and External Trade is the Bhutanese government ministry which oversees the foreign relations of Bhutan. The Royal Government of Bhutan established the Development Ministry in 1968, which was a precursor to the institution of the Department of Foreign Affairs in 1970 and subsequent up gradation to a full-fledged ministry in 1972.

As of right now, Bhutan maintains diplomatic ties with 54 nations, including the EU. New Delhi, Dhaka, Kuwait, Bangkok, Brussels, Canberra, and New York are home to its resident diplomatic missions, while New York and Geneva are home to its permanent US representations. In New York, Guwahati, and Kolkata, Bhutan has consulates. There are seventeen Bhutanese Honorary Consuls overseas. In Thimphu, there are resident missions from Kuwait, Bangladesh, and India. Bhutan is home to honorary consuls from fifteen nations. A number of international organisations, including the UN and others, have country offices in Thimphu.

== Background ==
The Development Ministry established in 1968, was a precursor to the establishment of the Department of Foreign Affairs in 1970. With the increasing need to undertake a focused approach to foreign policy, the department was upgraded to a Ministry in 1972.

Late Lyonpo Dawa Tshering was the first Foreign Minister. In the beginning, the Ministry had two departments: the Department of Multilateral Affairs and the Department of Bilateral Affairs. The Division level offered protocol services. The Asia and SAARC Division and the America and Europe Division were the two divisions of the Department of Bilateral Affairs. Under the Multilateral Department were the International Convention & Treaties Division and the Multilateral Division.

The Department of SAARC & Regional Organisations was founded with three divisions: the SAARC Division, the BIMSTEC Division, and the ACD and Others Division, during the 10th Five Year Plan (2008–2013). During the 11th Five Year Plan (2013–2018), two additional departments were added in response to the growing mission and workload. The former Protocol Division was transformed into a department consisting of three divisions: the Mission & Consular Services Division, the Program & Hospitality Division, and the Passport Division. To provide all support services related to administration and finance, human resources, procurement, information and communications technology, and legal services, the Directorate of Services (DoS) was established. Additionally, the Department of Multilateral Affairs and the Department of Bilateral Affairs were reorganised, each gaining a new division. In order to spread knowledge and foster a better understanding of Bhutan overseas, the Public Diplomacy Division was created in the 12th Five Year Plan (2018–2023).

== Vision ==
"Advancing Gross National Happiness for a peaceful, prosperous and sovereign Bhutan"

== Mission ==
"A professional Foreign Service that is responsive to Bhutan’s interests and aspirations"

== Departments ==
The Departments under Ministry of Foreign Affairs:

- Department of Bilateral Affairs
- Department of Multilateral Affairs
- Department of Protocol and Consular Affairs
- Department of Economic and Tech Diplomacy

== List of ministers ==
This is a list of ministers of foreign affairs of Bhutan:

No.	Name (Birth–Death)	Portrait	Tenure
1	Dawa Tsering (1935–2007)		1972–1998
2	Jigme Thinley (b. 1952)		1998–2003
3	Khandu Wangchuk (b. 1950)		2003–2007
—	Yeshey Dorji Acting Minister		2007–2008
4	Ugyen Tshering (b. 1954)		2008–2013
5	Rinzin Dorji (b. 1964)		2013–2015
6	Damcho Dorji (b. 1965)		2015–2018
—	Tshering Wangchuk Advisor		2018
7	Tandi Dorji (b. 1968)		2018–2024
8	D. N. Dhungyel		2024–present

== See also ==
- Ministry of Agriculture and Livestock
- Ministry of Education and Skills Development
- Ministry of Energy and Natural Resources
- Ministry of Finance
- Ministry of Health
- Ministry of Home Affairs
- Ministry of Industry, Commerce and Employment
- Ministry of Infrastructure and Transport
- Foreign relations of Bhutan
- List of diplomatic missions of Bhutan
