= Ministry of Agriculture and Livestock (Bhutan) =

Government ministry of Bhutan

- སོ་ནམ་དང་སྒོ་ནོར་ལྷན་ཁག། so nam dang sgo nor lhan khag
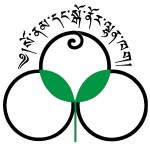

Ministry overview
- Jurisdiction: Government of Bhutan
- Minister responsible: Younten Phuntsho, Minister of Agriculture and Livestock
- Website: www.moal.gov.bt

Ministry of Agriculture and Forests (Dzongkha: སོ་ནམ་དང་སྒོ་ནོར་ལྷན་ཁག། Wylie: so nam dang sgo nor lhan khag) renamed as Ministry of Agriculture and Livestock (MOAL) is the ministry of Bhutan responsible to ensure sustainable social and economic well-being of the Bhutanese people through adequate access to food and natural resources.

== History ==
The Ministry of Agriculture and Livestock (MoA) was established in April 1985 under His Majesty’s Secretariat. Dasho Leki Dorji, Secretary to His Majesty’s Secretariat became the secretary of the newly established ministry. The ministry was then detached from His Majesty’s Secretariat in 1986 and moved to its present offices.

The Department of Forests (DoF) was established in 1952. In 1961, the Department of Agriculture (DoA) and the Department of Animal Husbandry (DoAH) were under the Ministry of Development (MoD), whilst the Department of Forests (DoF) was under the Ministry of Trade, Industry, and Forest. Ministries and Departments were restructured according to the cadre system that RCSC had instituted in the early 1980s. The MoA was consequently given control over agriculture, forestry, and animal husbandry. In 1985, the DoF, DoA, and DoAH were consolidated under the MoA. The Departments were situated in separate locations: DoF near the Swimming Pool, DoA at Kawajangsa, DoAH near the Trashi Chhodzong, and the Ministry of Agriculture (MoA) in lower Motithang.

The MoA started internal reorganisation in the early 1990s. A PPD was established in 1993 after the Departments' previous planning and policy activities were combined and merged under the Ministry. Likewise, the Departments' financial and administrative operations were combined and incorporated under the Ministry, for which AFD was established. The Department's allied planning, policy, administration, and finance departments were to receive services from these two divisions. This organisational shift was justified as a way to provide the Departments more time to concentrate on technical issues by relieving them of these duties. At about the same time, it was thought that a key component of sustainable agricultural development was the natural interconnectedness of livestock, forests, and farmland. The integration of agriculture, forest and livestock gained focus and significance. This ushered in organizational changes.

Most notably, in 1993, the DoA, now known as the Research Extension & Irrigation Division (REID), was brought in charge of combining the research and extension services. Only the research service of the DoF was united with the REID, whereas the research and extension services of the DoAH were integrated with it. The DoF continued to provide forestry extension services under the new name of the Forestry Service Division (FSD). Under the new name CLSD (Crop & animal Service Division), the DoAH joined with the agricultural and animal input suppliers and farm mechanisation.

Additionally, in 1993, the MoA established independent agencies NRTI, BFI, FCB, and BLC, which were subsequently rebranded as FDCL. FSD became the Department of Forestry Services (DOFS), CLSD became the Department of Agriculture & Livestock Support Services (DALSS), and the REID became the Department of Research & Developmental Services (DRDS) as part of additional reorganisations in 1999. The year also saw the creation of several independent organisations, such as the Quality Control & Regulatory Service (QCRS), the National Biodiversity Centre (NBC), Druk Seed Corporation (DSC), and the Information & Communication Service (ICS). AMS (Agriculture Marketing Service) was established in 2003, and QCRS was renamed BAFRA. After leaving the MoHCA and moving under the MoA in 2003, the DSLR gained independence as the National Land Commission in 2006. In the beginning of 2003, DRDS was divided into DoA and CoRE. They changed the name of the DALSS to DoL (Department of Livestock). FDCL was renamed as NRDCL (Natural Resource Developmental Corporation Limited) and the CoRE as CoRRB (Council of RNR Research of Bhutan) in the same year.

Following a 2009 reorganisation, the forestry industry was combined, and the Ministry became the Ministry of Agriculture and Forests (MoAF), while the Department of Forests became the Department of Forest and Park Services (DoFPS). After being renamed the Department of Agricultural Marketing and Cooperatives (DAMC), the Agriculture Marketing Service relocated its headquarters to lower Motithang. The CoRRB was reorganised as a council, and all of its research centres were transferred to the appropriate departments. The Ministry renamed the Druk Seed Corporation the National Seed Program and reorganised it under the Department of Agriculture in 2010.

== Vision ==
"The sustainable food system and natural resources for the equitable social and economic well-being of the Bhutanese people and the nation state."

== Mission ==
"To ensure the sustainable social and economic well-being of the Bhutanese people through adequate access to food and natural resources."

== Departments ==
The Departments under the Ministry of Agriculture and Livestock (MoAL):

- Department of Agriculture
- Department of Livestock
- Department of Agricultural Marketing and Cooperatives
- National Biodiversity Centre, Bhutan

== Ministers ==
- Dechen Wangmo Wangchuck (in 1985—1992 as Minister of Agriculture)
- Sangay Ngedup (in 2003-2007 as Minister of Agriculture)
- Pema Gyamtsho (in 2008-2013 as Minister of Agriculture and Forests)
- Yeshey Dorji (around 2016)
- Yeshey Penjor (7 November 2018 - 2023)
- Younten Phuntsho (28 January 2024 - present)

== See also ==
- Ministry of Education and Skills Development
- Ministry of Energy and Natural Resources
- Ministry of Finance
- Ministry of Foreign Affairs and External Trade
- Ministry of Health
- Ministry of Home Affairs
- Ministry of Industry, Commerce and Employment
- Ministry of Infrastructure and Transport
