= Cannabis in Bhutan =

- Location of Bhutan (dark green)
- Medicinal: Illegal
- Recreational: Illegal

Cannabis in Bhutan is illegal, but grows prolifically in the country and has multiple traditional uses, such as feeding pigs and producing textiles.

== Popularization ==
Awareness of cannabis as a drug seems limited in Bhutan, with some authorities tracing its arrival to the legalization of television in 1999; prior to that point, cannabis was mostly thought of as a fodder to fatten pigs. The International Narcotics Control Board noted in 2002 that Bhutan had no history of cannabis abuse, but the government had recently raised concerns about drug abuse, particularly by the young, and taken an interest in eradicating wild cannabis and counseling drug users.

== Enforcement ==
Bhutan's first arrest for drug abuse occurred in 1989 in Gelephu, where a man was arrested for abusing cannabis.

In 2010 the Bhutanese government seized 4 kg of cannabis; in 2011 this increased to 75 kg.

== Textiles ==
Though the wild nettle is the more common source of traditional textiles, cannabis has also been used for its fibre, and is called kenam in the Dzongkha language.
