= Damcho Dorji =

Bhutanese politician

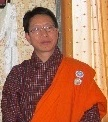
- Damcho Dorji in 2016

Foreign Minister of Bhutan
- In office 2 August 2015 – 2018
- Prime Minister: Tshering Tobgay
- Preceded by: Rinzin Dorji
- Succeeded by: Tandi Dorji

Personal details
- Born: 23 June 1965 (age 61) Gasa, Bhutan
- Party: People's Democratic Party
- Spouse: Kinzang Choden
- Children: 4
- Education: Sherubtse College; Government Law College, Mumbai; Georgetown University

Damcho Dorji (Dzongkha: དམ་ཆོས་རྡོ་རྗེ, born 23 June 1965) is a Bhutanese politician who served as Home Minister and Foreign Minister of Bhutan, in Tobgay cabinet from August 2013 to 2018.

== Early life and education ==
Born in Khailo, Gasa in 1965, Dorji studied at Punakha High School and undertook his undergraduate studies at Sherubtse College in Trashigang. He did his LL.B. from Government Law College in Mumbai and LL.M. from Georgetown University in Washington, D.C. He also did a PG Diploma in International Law and Organization for Development from the Institute for Social Studies (ISS) in the Netherlands.

== Career ==
Damcho Dorji was appointed the judge of Gelephu Court from 2000-2002. He was judge of Mongar District Court in 2002, Wangduephodrang District Court from 2003-2005, Punakha District Court in 2006. He was transferred as the Director of the Office of Legal Affairs in 2006. In 2006, Dorji was appointed the first Attorney General of Bhutan.

Damcho Dorji is a member of the People's Democratic Party and was first elected to the National Assembly of Bhutan in the 2008 elections for the Khatoed Laya constituency and was one of the two members of the first Opposition Party in the first democratic Parliament of Bhutan. . Following his reelection in the 2013 elections, Dorji was appointed the Minister for Home and Cultural Affairs in 2013 by Prime Minister Tshering Tobgay. In August 2015, he took over as Foreign Minister following the resignation of Rinzin Dorji over corruption charges.

== See also ==
- List of foreign ministers in 2017

Political offices
Preceded by Rinzin Dorji	Foreign Minister of Bhutan; 2015–2018	Succeeded by Tandi Dorji
