= D. N. Dhungyel =

Bhutanese politician

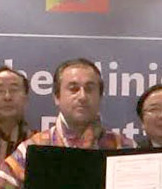
Dhungyel in 2015

D. N. Dhungyel is a Bhutanese politician who has been Foreign Minister for Bhutan since January 2024. Dhungyel is a member of the People's Democratic Party and represents the Phuentshogpelri–Samtse Constituency in the National Assembly of Bhutan. He served as the Minister for Information & Communications of Bhutan between 2013 and 2018.
