= Folk Heritage Museum =

Museum in Thimpu City, Thimpu District, Bhutan

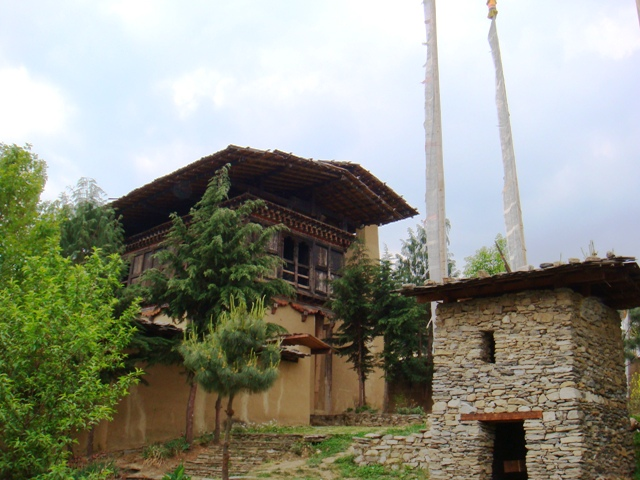
- Established: 28 July 2001; 24 years ago
- Location: Thimphu City, Thimphu District, Bhutan
- Coordinates: 27°28′57.3″N 89°37′55.2″E
- Type: museum
- Website: www.folkheritagemuseum.org.bt

The Folk Heritage Museum (also known as Phelchey Toenkhyim) is a museum in the Kawajangsa district of Thimphu, Thimphu District, in Bhutan. The museum was founded in 2001.

== History ==
The museum was opened on 28 July 2001 by the Queen Mother, Ashi Dorji Wangmo Wangchuck.

== Architecture ==
The museum is housed in a 3-story 19th century traditional rammed mud and timber house which is over 150 years old. It previously belonged to local chieftain, Kawang Mangkey. It is set in a rural area, surrounded by paddy, wheat and millet fields, a watermill, kitchen gardens, hot stone baths etc. The ground floor (Okhang) resembles a barn, the upper floor (Barthog) houses a store room (Phuna) and the top floor (Thabtshang) resembles a living and dining area. In addition, the house is equipped with tall narrow windows, called Gyelkha that allow for the circulation of air and natural light. The house also contains an altar (Choesham), important for reflecting on the spiritual heritage that is key to Bhutanese culture, and for the remembrance of ancestors.

== Exhibitions ==
The museums displays various materials related to the Bhutanese culture and way of life. Exhibitions includes rural households artifacts, cooking equipment, including weighing tools, traditional clothing, medieval suitcases, examples of food preservation techniques and rice storage.

The museum regularly holds events for education and culture demonstrations, allowing visitors to try archery, weaving, meditation, or Bhutanese dance. They also have a restaurant, which allows visitors to experience traditional Bhutanese food. They also offer the chance to celebrate a traditional Bhutanese wedding at the museum.

== See also ==
- List of museums in Bhutan
