= National Library of Bhutan =

- Druk Gyelyong Pedzö

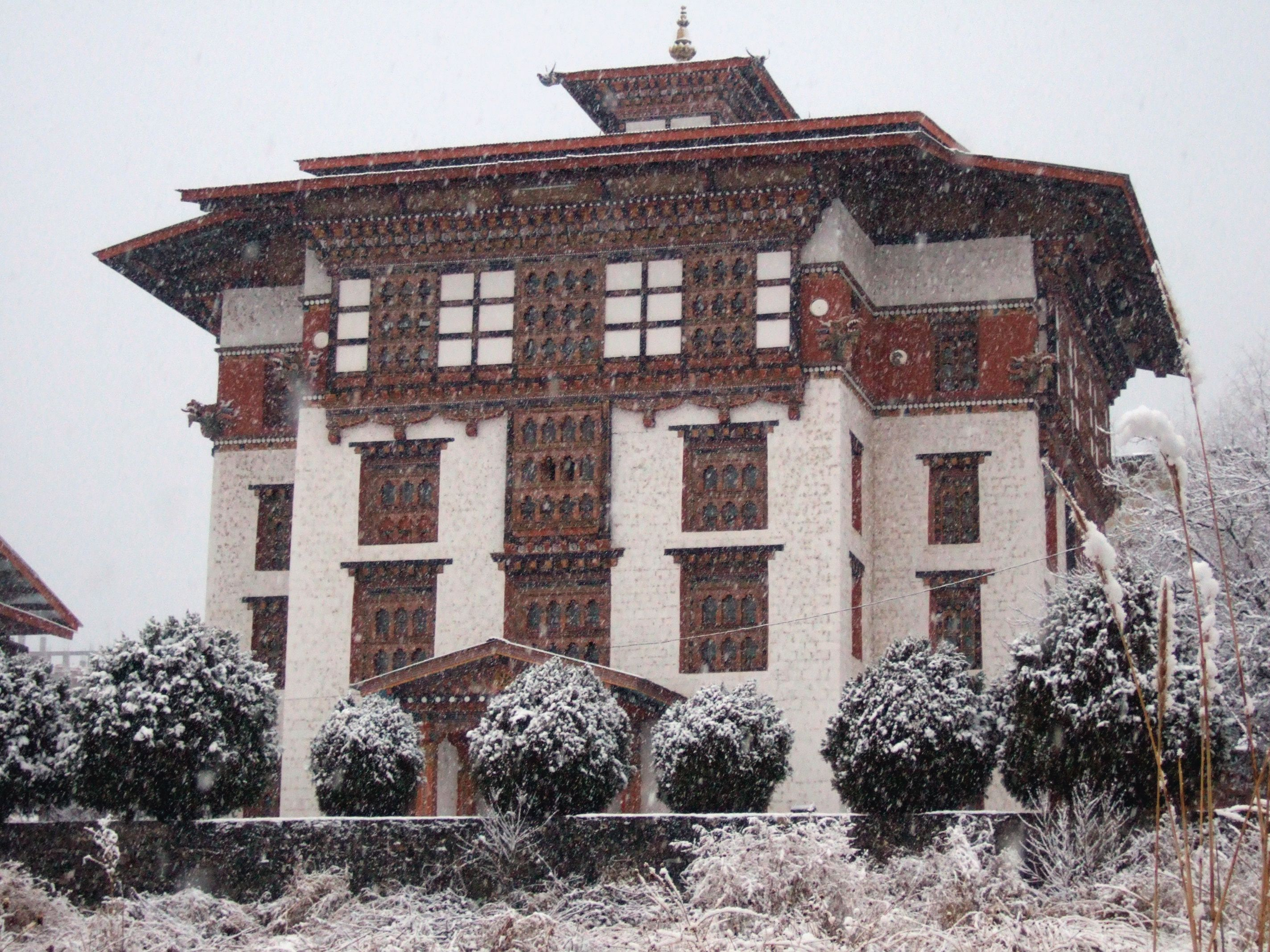
- 27°29′00″N 89°37′56″E
- Location: Bhutan
- Type: National library
- Established: 1967 (59 years ago)

Collection
- Legal deposit: Yes, since 1999

Other information
- Budget: some Nu.3 million - was borne entirely by the Royal Government of Bhutan (i.e. without any foreign aid).
- Director: Harka B. Gurung (2010–present)
- Employees: 35
- Website: library.gov.bt

The National Library of Bhutan (NLB; Dzongkha: འབྲུག་རྒྱལ་ཡོངས་དཔེ་མཛོད།, romanized: Druk Gyelyong Pedzö), located in Thimphu, Bhutan, was established in 1967 for the purpose of "preservation and promotion of the rich cultural and religious heritage" of Bhutan. It is located in the Kawajangtsa area of Thimphu, above the Royal Thimphu Golf Course, near the Folk Heritage Museum and the National Institute for Zorig Chusum (Traditional Arts and Crafts).

== History ==
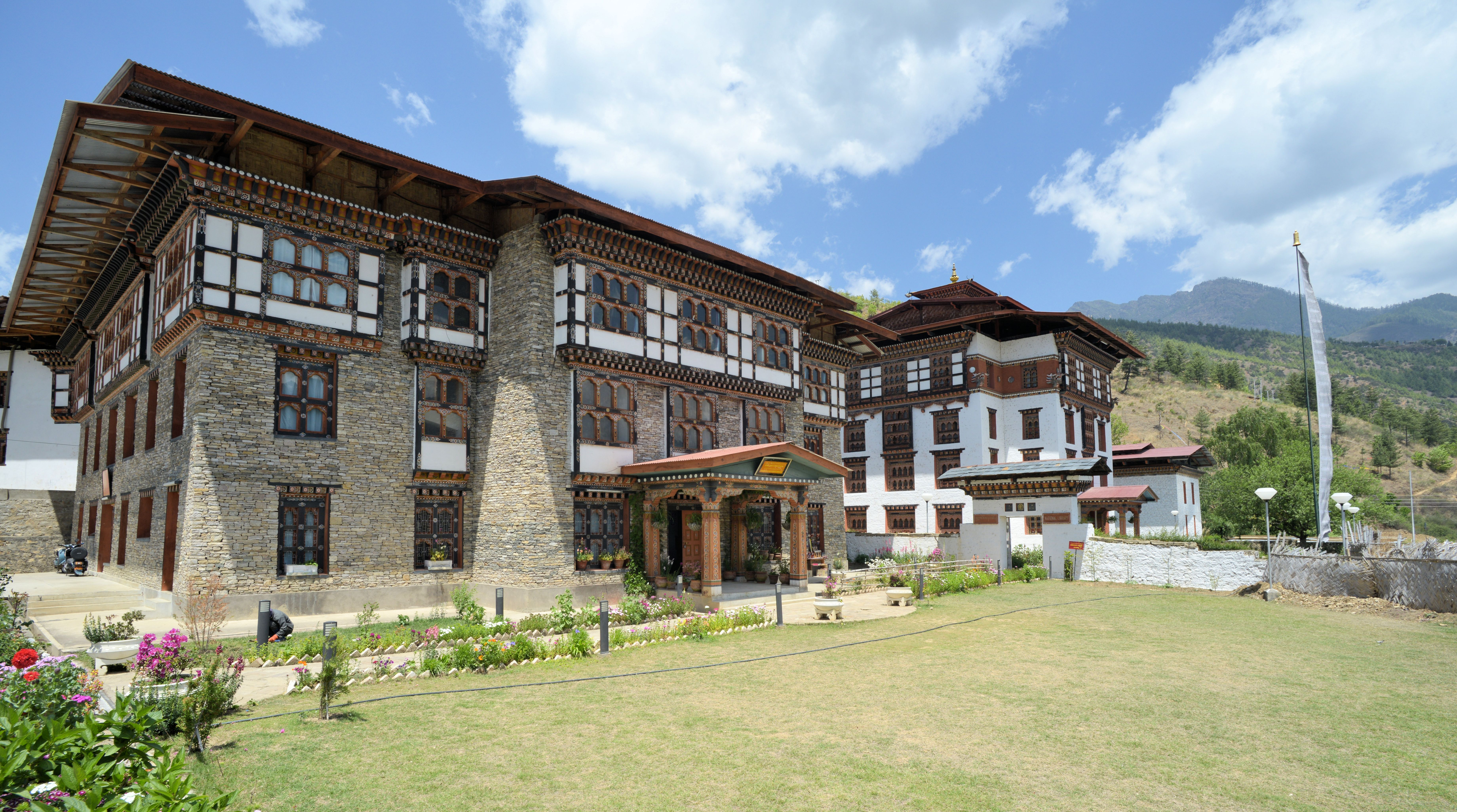
The National Library and Archives of Bhutan.

The National Library of Bhutan was first established in 1967 under the patronage of HM Queen Ashi Phuntso Choden (1911–2003), with a small collection of precious texts. The library was initially housed within the central tower (utse) of Tashichodzong. Later, due to its growing collection, it had to move to a building in the Changgangkha area of Thimphu.

To provide a permanent home for the sacred religious books and manuscripts in the growing collection, construction of the present four-storeyed eight-cornered traditional building, which looks like the central tower temple of a Bhutanese Dzong, in the Kawajangtsa area of Thimphu was initiated. The cost of the construction of this building was borne entirely by the Royal Government of Bhutan without any foreign aid.

This building, which houses the collection of traditional texts, was inaugurated and consecrated as a temple by H.H. Dilgo Khyentse Rinpoche on November 23, 1984 in order to provide a sacred space for the religious books which form the bulk of the collection. The library moved into its permanent home at the end of 1984 under the auspices of the then Special Commission for Cultural Affairs.

== Directors ==
1. Geshe Tshewang (1967–1973)
2. Lopen Pemala (1973–1993)
3. Sangay Wangchug (1993–1999)
4. Mynak R.Tulku (1999–2004)
5. Dorjee Tshering (2005–2007)
6. Gyonpo Tshering (2007–2010)
7. Harka B. Gurung (2010–present)

== National Archives ==
The National Archives is responsible for collecting and preserving important past, present and future documents on Bhutan for future generations.

In July 2000, Denmark signed an agreement to support the National Archives to provide assistance for the construction of a modern archive building. This two storied building, which was completed in 2004 is equipped with a modern security and fire alarm system as well as temperature and humidity control.

=== Our National Memory Bank ===
The repository rooms of the archives now house many important documents including old records, old letters and around seven thousand important photographs. The archives also hold microfilms of many other important documents. Particularly rare and important books and manuscripts from the National Library collection are also kept in their secure and controlled facilities. Thus the archives is the foundation of our National Memory Bank.

The National Archives solicits co-operation from all concerned in its effort to create our National Memory Bank. We therefore request individuals and institutions, inside and outside the country holding important documents and other material related to Bhutan which may be of interest to future generations, to provide copies for our National Archives.

=== Microfilming Facility & Service ===
The National Library offers a free microfilming service for institutions and individuals within Bhutan holding important and rare texts and documents. They actively encourage anyone holding such documents to bring them to the library for microfilming in order to ensure the long term preservation of the contents of these documents should anything happen to the original. Upon microfilming the original text or document will be returned to the provider along with one microfilm copy, and one copy will be held in the archives in safe and secure controlled storage conditions.

=== Conservation & Preservation ===
The archives primarily deals with paper documents. Paper is composed of organic materials which deteriorate with the passage of time. Documents printed on modern paper often contain bleaches and other chemicals which can speed up this deterioration. Similarly photographs and film often contains chemical traces left over from processing which can cause deterioration. Therefore, when documents or photographs are selected for preservation it is important that they are treated to neutralize these harmful chemical residues.

=== Legal Deposit Act ===
National Assembly of Bhutan hereby enacts this Legal Deposit Act: An Act to Collect, Preserve and Manage Bhutan's Documentary Heritage on July 20, 1999 to legally collect and save print, non-print, electronic, audio visual and electronic texts, all the forms of documents that relate to the Bhutan and national interests. There are eight parts in the Legal Deposit Act.

=== Future Plans ===
In the 10th five-year plan the National Archives plans to carry out a nationwide survey to determine where records of national importance are located; and in what form, shape and condition these records are being maintained. If such records are not being taken care of properly we will endeavour to assist the owners and custodians of these records to ensure their proper preservation.

They also plan to create special Oral History Tradition and Audio Visual Unit to survey, create and maintain Oral History and Audio Visual documentation for the nation.

== Highlights of the collections ==
- Longchenpa's Seven Treasuries - (Longchen Dzo Dun) - The complete set of printing blocks for the edition of the Seven Treasuries originally commissioned by Dodrup Chen Rinpoche in Gangtok (c. 1968) are now held at the National Library of Bhutan and re-printed from time to time on Bhutanese paper.
- Collected Works of Padma Karpo (Kunkhyen Ka-bum) - A complete set of xylographic printing blocks of the complete works of Kunkhyen Padma Karpo are held at the National Library of Bhutan and re-printed from time to time.
