= Norbu Wangchuk =

Bhutanese politician

Norbu Wangchuk is the former Bhutanese Minister for Education, having served in the Tobgay cabinet from 2013 to 2018.

Wangchuk was appointed as the Minister for Economic Affairs when the People's Democratic Party won the 2013 elections. On April 8, 2016, he was appointed the Minister of Education after former Education Minister Mingbo Drukpa resigned.

Wangchuk has a bachelor's degree in botany and zoology, an MBA, and postgraduate certification in education (PGCE). He started his career as a teacher and moved on to become a senior lecturer at the Royal Institute of Management (RIM). He later worked as an education researcher and consultant.
