= Dimple Thapa =

Bhutan politician

- Education: Dr. Yashwant Singh Parmar University of Horticulture and Forestry; University of Natural Resources and Life Sciences in Vienna
- Occupation: politician
- Employer(s): Department of Forests and Park Services
- Known for: Minister for Minister of Education and Skills Development
- Term: four years
- Political party: People's Democratic Party

Dimple Thapa is a People's Democratic Party politician and minister from Bhutan. She trained in forestry before she was elected to the National Assembly. In 2024, she became the only woman in Tshering Tobgay's cabinet as the Minister of Education and Skills Development.

== Life ==
Thapa comes from the far western part of Bhutan in the Yoeseltse Gewog. She studied for her first degree at the Dr. Yashwant Singh Parmar University of Horticulture and Forestry in India and she then took a master's degree, again in forestry, at the University of Natural Resources and Life Sciences in Vienna, Austria. She has co-authored a number of papers dealing with the wildlife of Bhutan. In 2010, she published a paper on bio-diversity conservation in Nepal.

She had joined the civil service as a Forestry Officer in 2005 and she rose to be Chief Forestry Officer looking after the Tsirang's Territorial Divisional Office within the Department of Forests and Park Services.

From November 2023 to January 2024, the national elections took place to elect new members of the 47 seat National Assembly. Thapa was the only woman in her party and one of only two women elected to the assembly. This was the lowest number of women elected since the start of democratic elections in 2008. Only six women were candidates in the final round and only Thapa and Dorji Wangmo were elected. Dorji Choden, who had been the country's first woman minister, lost her seat to a man despite her experience. It is speculated that rural voters see politics as a job for a man, although at a local level candidates others have followed Namgay Peldon's 2008 example and they have been elected. In this election, there were over 300,000 voters and the men were outnumbered by women voters.

In 2024, she was the only woman elected in the winning party and she became the only woman in Tshering Tobgay's ten-person cabinet. She became the Minister of Education and Skills Development.
