= Lekey Dorji =

Bhutanese politician

Lekey Dorji (born 10 February 1970) is a Bhutanese politician who is currently serving as the finance minister, Royal Government of Bhutan, since January 28, 2024. He is a member of parliament from Bardo Trong constituency, Zhemgang.
