= Ministry of Health (Bhutan) =

Government ministry of Bhutan

- གསོ་བའི་ལྷན་ཁག། gso b'i lhan khag
- Logo of the Ministry of Health

- National Emblem of Bhutan

Ministry overview
- Jurisdiction: Government of Bhutan
- Headquarters: Kawajangsa, Thimphu, Bhutan
- Minister responsible: Tandin Wangchuk, Minister of Health
- Website: www.health.gov.bt

The Ministry of Health (Dzongkha: གསོ་བའི་ལྷན་ཁག།; Wylie: gso b'i lhan khag) is ministry of Bhutan responsible for management and development of health reforms in the country.

== Background ==
The two traditions of traditional and allopathic medicine are fundamental to the history of Bhutan's health services. Few credible accounts exist of the first Indian-trained doctors and paramedics bringing western medicine to the kingdom in the early 20th century, but as early as the 7th century, Bhutanese people were using Sowa Rigpa, or traditional medicine, which is based on Tibetan medical practices.

In the monarchy today, both allopathic and traditional medicine are used and practiced without any sense of rivalry or prejudice. Regardless of whatever medical treatment proves to be more effective for their condition, Bhutanese people are entitled to and receive both forms of medical care.

=== Allopathic/Modern Medicine Practice ===
Very little is known about how western medicine was introduced to Bhutan. Compounder Khoe's posting at Sarpang provided the first modern medical treatment in Bhutan; nonetheless, the services of the local tea garden doctors across the border were utilised in all other towns, with excellent personal relationships maintained.

In Thimphu and Paro, several licentiate (LMF) doctors with Indian training independently practiced medicine, mainly as royal physicians. Dr. Tobgyel completed his LMF training at Jalpaiguri Jackson Medical School and began working at Kungarapten in 1951 as the first LMF physician. He was once more sent for his MBBS in 1952, and after finishing the two-year accelerated program, he returned to service, becoming the nation's first MBBS physician. He reported for duty to His Majesty Jigme Dorji Wangchuk at Dechencholing Palace in Thimphu in 1954. The commencement of planned health services delivery was initiated by His Late Majesty, Third King Jigme Dorji Wangchuck, who established the complete modern health delivery facilities for Thimphu from a one-room dispensary at Tashichhodzong.

At the same time, trained compounders were assigned to isolated settlements, while paramedics (compounders) were still receiving training at Charteries Hospital in Kalimpong. Kalikhola was the posting for Compounder Kinley (later D.C. Kinley). To address the health care requirements of its citizens, local officials in Samchi, Sarbang, Chirang, and Sibsoo established tiny dispensaries, first involving foreign compounders. Then, under His Late Majesty's direction, a 20-bed hospital with local architecture was built in Thimphu, and it was finished in 1956. With the help of Finish Missionary doctors (nuns), a ten-bed hospital was constructed in Samchi. Although more of the on-the-job training/apprentice was formally finished at Charteries Hospital in Kalimpong and then posted to the various clinics across the nation, the training of compounders persisted.

As a result, when the nation's planned socioeconomic development program began in 1961, we had 11 clinics spread across Haa, Paro, Trongsa, Bumthang, Trashigang, Sibsoo, Tsirang, Samdrupjongkhar, Kalikhola, and Dagapela, as well as two hospitals (Thimphu and Samtse). These were all staffed by foreign physicians and nurses, with relatively few domestic medical and paramedical staff. At that time, a number of paramedics (compounders) received training in India before being assigned to various dispensaries across the nation. Samtse, Trashigang, and Gelephu district hospitals were established when Thimphu Hospital opened in 1961, marking the start of the infrastructure development. BHUs were established in Trongsa and Bumthang in the early 1970s after a few dispensaries opened in the 1960s. Real infrastructure development didn't start until the 1980s, when Bhutan signed the Alma Ata statement in 1978, which emphasised the Primary Health Care concept.There are currently 156 BHUs, 654 outreach clinics, and 28 hospitals.

In order to teach the paramedical staff who form the cornerstone of the Bhutanese health system, the Royal Institute of Health Sciences (RIHS) was established in 1974. It was a significant step towards the nation's health workforce becoming more self-sufficient, even if medical staff training still primarily relied on nearby regional medical schools. Traditional medicine has continued to play a part in Bhutanese health care even after the arrival of western medicine. Sowa rigpa has been important from its inception, coupled with the spiritual cures provided by religious organisations. In 1967, Sowa Rigpa was accepted as the official medical tradition and included into the healthcare system.

=== Traditional Medicine Practice ===
Bhutan has a special chance to overcome the challenge presented by modern development at a time when everything traditional is being arbitrarily dismissed in comparison to modern science. Without losing important indigenous knowledge, it can stay up with the discoveries of the past century. Traditional medicine is one significant area. Following Zhabdrung's arrival in Bhutan in 1616, traditional medicine was first brought to the country in the 17th century. Because of its fertility, mountains, and variety of medicinal plants that can be found at elevations ranging from 200 to 7800 meters above sea level, Tibetans have long referred to Bhutan as Lhomenjong, or the valley of medicinal herbs.

Following the sixteenth century, Bhutanese travelled to Tibet to study medicine. Tibet supplied institutions for Bhutanese medical education, while Bhutanese physicians in turn brought medicinal plants as far as Lhasa or Kham, according to the reciprocity principle. After training, the majority of the physicians would go back to Bhutan and open their own clinics in dzongs or monasteries. There was a lot of support for traditional medicine, particularly after 1885 when the Penlops and Dzongpoens began to use it. The courts retained at least one or two doctors on a private basis.

Officially, the Department of Health services' Traditional Medicine division was established. The Government was primarily responsible for funding, but international organisations such as UNICEF, WHO, and Disarmo e Sviluppo (DISVI, an Italian NGO) were also involved. The government acknowledged the cultural and scientific value of traditional medicine in 1967. After it was incorporated into the national health system, citizens had the option to choose between traditional and allopathic medications. In Thimphu, the first two traditional dispensaries and a traditional medical school were founded in 1979. After WHO donated some pharmaceutical equipment in 1982, it was able to begin planning the development of dispensaries to other districts, including Punakha, Trashigang, Trongsa, Bumthang, and eventually Haa. Opening of other traditional dispensaries in all districts began slowly.

In 1988, the government set up a Coordination Centre in an indigenous dispensary in Thimphu with the help of DISVI. These facilities comprised a training library, an outpatient clinic, a laboratory, and a hostel. It paved the way for the integration of contemporary scientific techniques into conventional medical practices. The chemical and pharmacological components of plants and other ingredients utilised in pharmaceutical formulas were examined. With assistance from DISVI, the National Institute of Traditional Medicine (NITM) was founded over the course of the following four years. As the centre for traditional medicine development, NITM served as a foundation for the field's future growth, conducting research, producing medications, and treating patients.

Traditional medicine in Bhutan was institutionalised by Drungthso Pema Dorji. His Majesty Jigmi Wangchuck's queen, Ashi Om, was treated by his grandpa, Drungthso Chimi Gyeltshen. In 1946, Pema Dorji departed to train as a Drungthso in Lhasa Chakpori, Tibet, after she gave him instructions to carry on the profession to his grandson. After earning his degree in 1953, he went back to Bhutan and worked for his uncle, Neten Tsewang Gyeltshen, in Trongsa Dzong for nine years. He and Drungthso Sherab Jorden lay the groundwork for the establishment of the first government-run traditional hospital in Dechencholing in 1968. When the new indigenous hospital in Kawajangsa opened in 1979, the main functions of the old hospital were moved there.

The NITM performs three tasks: treating patients, researching and producing indigenous medicine, and training Drungthso and sMenpa (traditional compounders). The institute is currently evaluating the potential for selling its herbal items in the West and has the capacity to produce pharmaceuticals. All 20 districts now have access to these treatments thanks to the attachment of indigenous units to the district hospitals in the periphery.

== Vision ==
"A Nation with the Best health"

== Mission ==
- To provide quality healthcare services in both traditional and modern medicines.
- To prevent, control, eliminate and eradicate diseases.
- To rehabilitate and promote healthy living.
- To ensure sustainable, responsive, equatable, accessible, reliable and affordable health services.

== Departments ==
The Department under Ministry of Health:

- Department of Public Health
- Department of Health Services

== Minister ==
- Sangay Ngedup (in 1998–99 as Minister of Health and Education)
- Zangley Dukpa (2008-2012)
- Tandin Wangchuk (2013-2018)
- Dechen Wangmo (7 November 2018 – 2024)
- Tandin Wangchuk (28 January 2024- present)

== See also ==
- Ministry of Agriculture and Livestock
- Ministry of Education and Skills Development
- Ministry of Energy and Natural Resources
- Ministry of Finance
- Ministry of Foreign Affairs and External Trade
- Ministry of Home Affairs
- Ministry of Industry, Commerce and Employment
- Ministry of Infrastructure and Transport
