= Dorji Choden =

Bhutanese politician

Aum Dorji Choden (born 5 December 1960) is a Bhutanese politician. She was appointed minister of Bhutan's Works and Human Settlement Ministry in 2013, making her the first woman to serve as a minister in Bhutanese cabinet.

== Education ==
She received her primary and secondary schooling in Bhutan and earned a bachelor's degree in civil engineering from the Birla Institute of Technology in Ranchi, Jharkhand, India. She also has a master's degree in public administration from Syracuse University in the United States.

== Civil service career ==
Choden started her career as an assistant engineer in the Public Works Department, which made her the first female engineer in Bhutan. She later served as chief of the Public Health Engineering Division of Bhutan. In January 2000 she became the director of the Standard and Quality Control Authority of Bhutan. In January 2006 she was appointed as a commissioner of the Anti-Corruption Commission of Bhutan, an autonomous body which was established in the same year.

During her tenure in civil service she represented technical and gender issues at national, regional and international forums. In 2008 Bhutan changed from being a monarchy to a constitutional monarchy, and in order to participate in Bhutan's first parliamentary election, she resigned from the Anti-Corruption Commission, as the Constitution of Bhutan does not allow a civil servant to take part in election, but was defeated in the polls. Then In 2009, she began working as assistant resident representative of the United Nations poverty and Millennium Development Goals unit where she handled the poverty portfolio, addressing youth employment and women's empowerment until 2012.

== Political career ==
In 2008, she joined the People's Democratic Party (PDP), the first registered political party in Bhutan, and ran to represent the Thrimshing constituency in Trashigang. She received a thrashing defeat and left politics temporarily to work with the United Nations.

In 2012, she resigned from the UN and joined the newly formed political party, Druk Nyamrup Tshogpa (DNT). She became the president of the DNT, making her one of the first women to lead a political party in Bhutan with Lily Wangchuk, president of the Druk Chirwang Tshogpa. In the primary election of 31 May 2013, she won an overwhelming victory in her constituency, but her party did not succeed. Only the People's Democratic Party and the Druk Phuensum Tshogpa participated in the general election, winning the majority of the votes in the primary election.

At that point, she rejoined the PDP at their invitation, though there was speculation of DPT offering seat. However, the Constitution of Bhutan does not allow coalition governments, and she was accused of forming a coalition with the PDP. As Choden had been president of the DNT, many people felt that leaving her own party and joining the winning party was a sign of a hunger for power. Despite the criticism, she joined the PDP and later won a seat in the general election of 13 July 2013. The party elected her to head the Ministry of Works and Human Settlement, making her the first woman minister in Bhutan.

She encountered controversy after she made a statement in the media about gender discrimination in Bhutan, and a critic website published an article criticizing her statement. Along with her portfolio as a minister, she is also the chair of the National Commission for Women and Child of Bhutan and chair of Bhutan Education City.

== Honours ==
- Bhutan
  - The Royal Red Scarf (16 April 2016).
