= List of universities and colleges in Bhutan =

Bhutan has thirteen colleges and three universities that are the Royal University of Bhutan (RUB), Khesar Gyalpo University of Medical Sciences of Bhutan (KGUMSB), and Dorden Tashithang Buddhist University.

This is a list of universities and colleges in Bhutan.

== Private colleges ==
- Royal Thimphu College
- Royal Institute of Management is an autonomous institute
- Royal Institute for Tourism and Hospitality

== Colleges under the Royal University of Bhutan ==
- Sherubtse College
- Jigme Namgyel Engineering College
- Samtse College of Education
- Gaedu College of Business Studies
- Paro College of Education
- College of Natural Resources
- College of Science and Technology
- College of Language and Culture Studies

== Colleges under the Khesar Gyalpo University of Medical Sciences of Bhutan ==
- Royal Institute of Health Sciences (Faculty of Nursing and Public Health)
- Institute of Traditional Medicine Services (Faculty of Traditional Medicine)
- Faculty of Postgraduate Medicine
