= Health in Bhutan =

Health in Bhutan is one of the government's highest priorities in its scheme of development and modernization. Health and related issues are overseen by the Ministry of Health, itself represented on the executive Lhengye Zhungtshog (cabinet) by the Minister of Health. As a component of Gross National Happiness, affordable and accessible health care is central to the public policy of Bhutan.

The Constitution of Bhutan charges the Royal Government with ensuring a "safe and healthy environment," and with providing "free access to basic public health services in both modern and traditional medicines".

The Human Rights Measurement Initiative finds that Bhutan is fulfilling 85.5% of what it should be fulfilling for the right to health based on its level of income. When looking at the right to health with respect to children, Bhutan achieves 91.8% of what is expected based on its current income. In regards to the right to health amongst the adult population, the country achieves only 80.7% of what is expected based on the nation's level of income. Bhutan falls into the "bad" category when evaluating the right to reproductive health because the nation is fulfilling only 84.1% of what the nation is expected to achieve based on the resources (income) it has available.

== Health care system ==
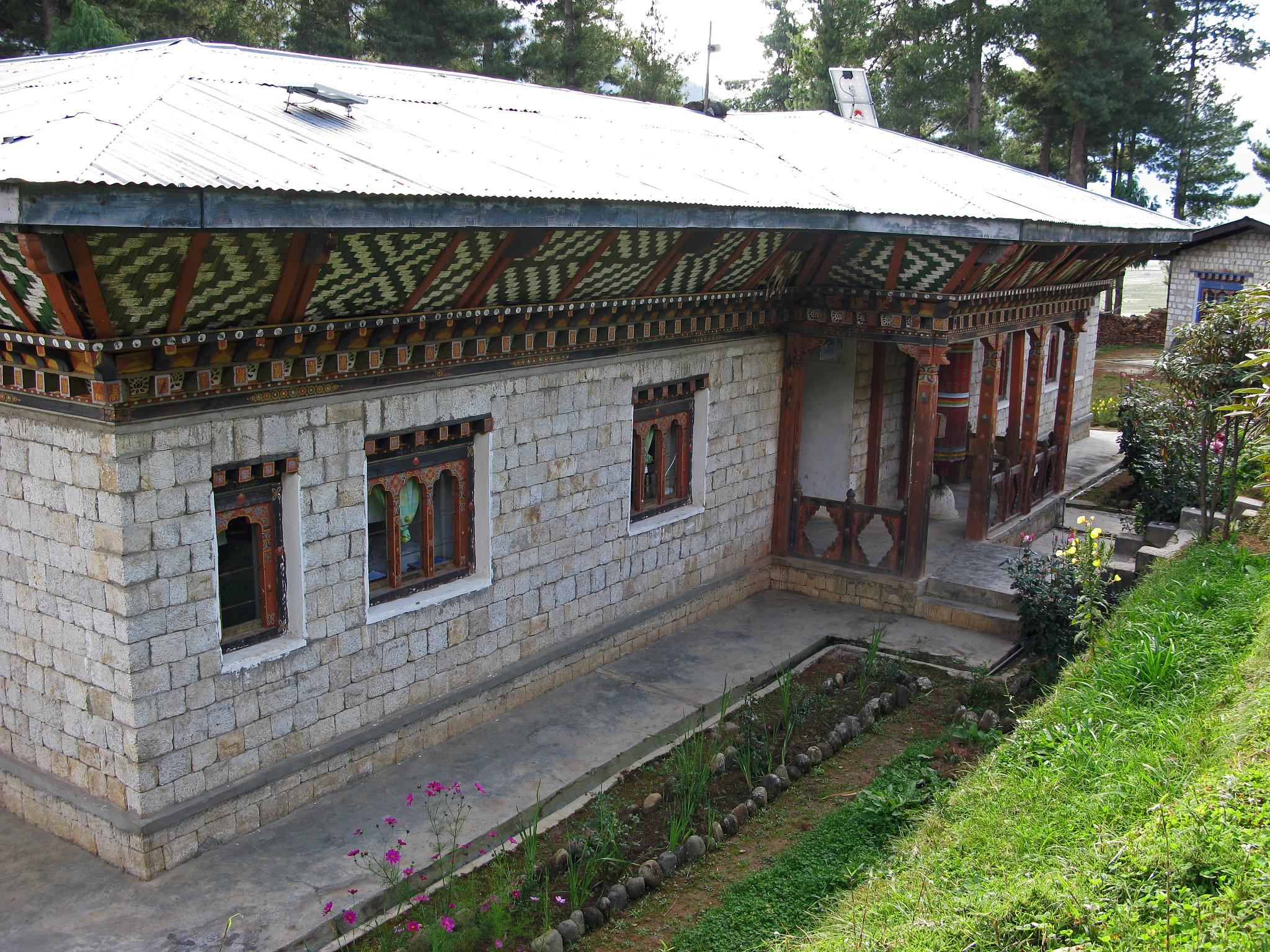
A Basic Health Unit in Phobjika Valley, Wangdue Phodrang District.

The Ministry of Health has provided universal health care in Bhutan since the 1970s. Health care infrastructure and services are planned and developed through Five Year Plans (FYP) of the Ministry of Health. The third democratically appointed Health Minister, Lyonpo Dechen Wangmo, is the head of the Ministry of Health.

Two major pieces of Bhutanese legislation establish a framework for personnel and medicines. The Medical and Health Council Act of 2002 incorporates the Medical and Health Council as a legal entity to regulate medical schools, courses, and professional credentials. The Medicines Act of 2003 establishes the Bhutan Medicines Board and Drugs Technical Advisory Committee. The Act authorizes several subsidiary organizations, including the Bhutanese Drug Regulatory Authority, Drug Testing Laboratory, and teams of Drug Inspectors. These agencies have rulemaking and law enforcement authority on drugs, medicines, and even price controls, but must operate within the laws of Bhutan. Both pieces of legislation contain offenses germane to their subject matter, supplementing the Penal Code.

=== Health care facilities ===
As of 2013, there were 32 hospitals across Bhutan. Most dzongkhags had at least one hospital, with the exception of Gasa. Thimphu had 5 hospitals, while Chukha, Samtse, and Trashigang Districts each had 3. Every dzongkhag had a number of smaller medical facilities, and Thimphu had an indigenous hospital facility available. One of the more notable hospitals is the Jigme Dorji Wangchuck National Referral Hospital in Thimphu.

These hospitals and smaller facilities were supported by 3,756 Ministry of Health employees in thirteen categories: 244 doctors; 957 nurses; 92 nurse's assistants; 505 "health workers;" 35 Dzongkhag Health Officers and Assistants; 41 drungtshos (traditional physicians); 52 smenpas (traditional physicians); 12 pharmacists; 79 pharmacy assistants and technicians; 13 lab technologists; 549 other technicians and assistants; and 1,601 administrative and support staff.

=== Emergency and health hotline ===
On May 2, 2011, Bhutan launched its telephonic Health Help Centre (HHC), which had proved successful over the prior two months. The HHC number is 112. The HHC provides two services: Emergency Response and the Healthcare Helpline, both accessible through landed and mobile phones. Emergency responses are served by 61 ambulances in 37 locations with 59 emergency medical technicians around the kingdom, equipped with GPS and GIS technology. The Healthcare Helpline dispenses medical advice.

=== Funding ===
The cost and availability of health care facilities – some of which operate on a 24-hour basis – is a subject of discussion in Bhutan. Issues of affordability and sustainability have called into question Bhutan's proposed funding schemes.

== Health issues ==
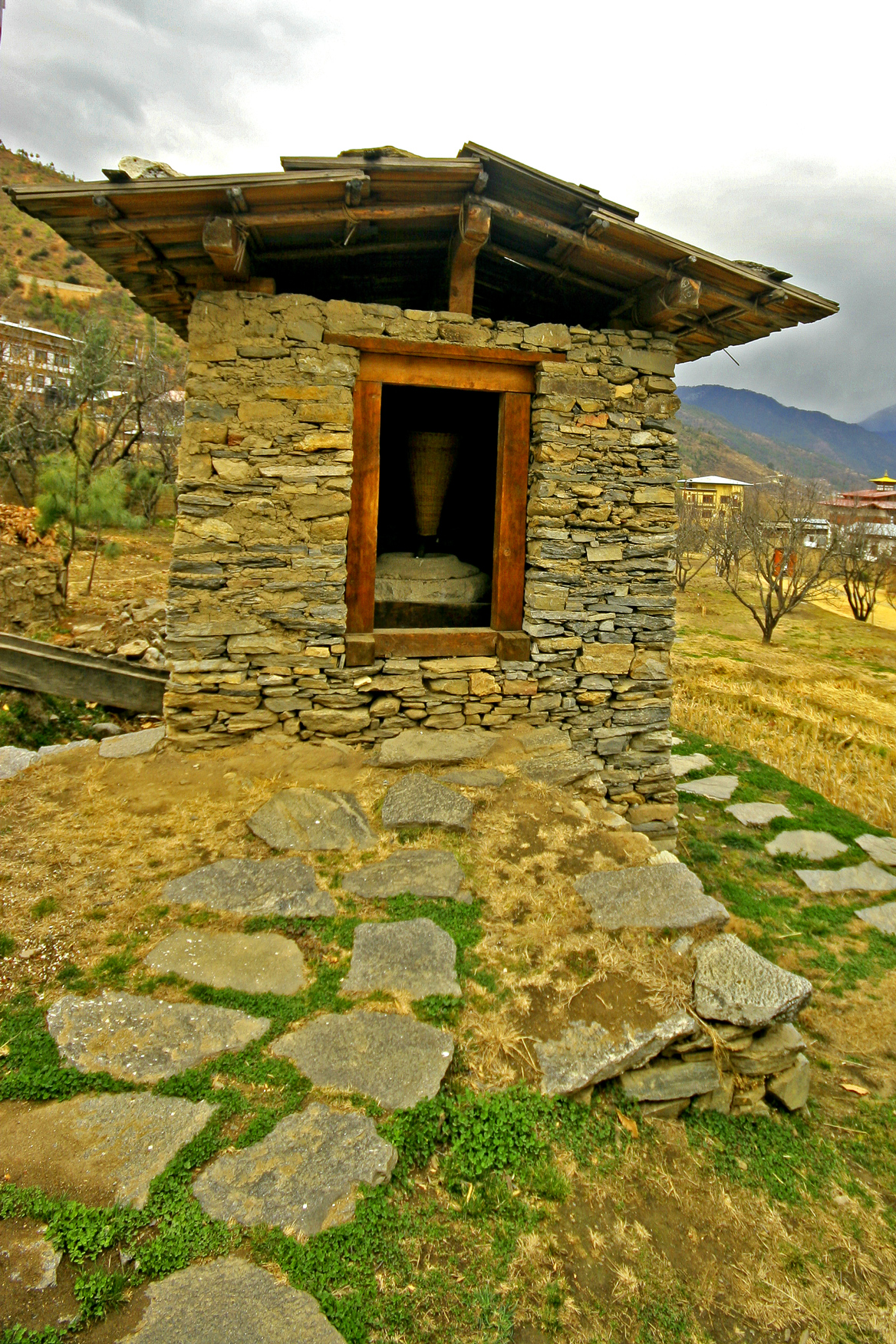
An outhouse in Bhutan. Over 90% of Bhutanese have access to basic sanitation.

As of 2009, most Bhutanese had access to potable drinking water (83%) and basic sanitation (91%). Widespread health concerns included diarrhea (2,892 per 10,000 people) and pneumonia (1,031) among children under age 5; skin infections (1,322); conjunctivitis (542); hypertension (310); and intestinal worms (170). Less widespread were diabetes (38 per 10,000 people); alcohol-related liver disease (23); and cancer (17). Incidence of malaria and tuberculosis was generally low, at 10 and 15 cases per 10,000 people, respectively.

Influenza, including H1N1 ("swine flu") and H5N1 ("bird flu") strains, are present in Bhutan. As of 2009, there were 6 confirmed cases of H1N1, none of which was fatal. Bird flu, however, has resulted in at least one outbreak in Phuntsholing and remains a "serious concern" of the Ministry of Health.

=== HIV/AIDS ===
In 2011, there were 246 reported cases of HIV, representing just over 0.3% of the population. Through 2010, infection rates remained modest though increasing, totaling 185 reported cases, or 0.1% of the population. The Ministry of Health attributed climbing numbers to promiscuity, drug use, and the prevalence of HIV/AIDS in neighboring countries.

=== Maternal and child healthcare ===
As of 2008, 90% of the population were covered by the government's immunization regimen. In 2010, the Ministry of Health noted a growing trend of unsafe abortions among Bhutanese women (466 in 2003; 1,057 in 2009), apparently performed in neighboring India, contributing to Bhutan's high maternal mortality rate.

In 2011, Bhutan had a maternal mortality rate of 200 per 100,000. This is compared with 254.9 in 2008 and 1145.4 in 1990. The under 5 mortality rate, per 1,000 births was 81 and the neonatal mortality as a percentage of mortality under 5 years was 43. In Bhutan the number of midwives per 1,000 live births was 15 and the lifetime risk of death for pregnant women was 1 in 170.

=== Food safety ===
Bhutan regulates public health and safety in regards to food under the Food Act of 2005. The Food Act establishes the National Food Quality and Safety Commission and the Bhutan Agriculture and Food Regulatory Authority ("BAFRA"), both of which are overseen by the Ministry of Agriculture. While the Ministry of Agriculture is singularly authorized to author regulations under the Food Act, the Minister of Agriculture may delegate authority to ministries responsible for health, trade, and customs.

The National Food Quality and Safety Commission is chaired by the Minister of Agriculture and comprises ten additional members from various relevant government ministries and agencies regulating agriculture, health, commerce, home affairs, legal affairs, and the environment. The Commission formulates the government's food policy, while the BAFRA is responsible for advising and implementing the Commission's policies, including health and safety inspections.

BAFRA inspectors have broad authority to search, document, test, and seize food wherever it is transported, stored, prepared, or served; inspectors may also destroy unsafe food when it poses a "clear and present danger for human health or the environment". The Act further establishes health guidelines for businesses that serve or trade in food, including provisions allowing for food testing, and defines government authority in regulating food imports and exports. The Food Act, like other Bhutanese legislation, defines relevant offenses and penalties for failing to conform to proscribed laws and regulations.

=== Tobacco ===
Tobacco sale and consumption is actively discouraged by the government of Bhutan through education, economic, and penal incentives. The Tobacco Control Act bans the sale of tobacco, taxes imports, and places restrictions on quantities individuals may possess. The Act also authorizes the Tobacco Control Board, through the Tobacco Control Office, to provide cessation programs in health facilities and to work with rehabilitation centers in diagnosing and counseling tobacco dependence.

The Tobacco Control Office is occupied by the Bhutan Narcotic Control Agency and headed by its executive director. The Office acts as the agent of the Board responsible for coordinating most of the actual implementation of Bhutan's tobacco policy. The Ministry of Health, Ministry of Economic Affairs, Ministry of Finance, Ministry of Education, and Ministry of Home and Cultural Affairs are all responsible for implementing the laws in the Act and the policies of the Board in specified arenas.

=== Alcohol ===
In 2011, the government passed its Alcohol Control Regulation, which imposed up to three times the previous taxes on alcohol. As a result, alcohol sales have dropped and prices have risen. Alcohol consumption among students has risen in the recent past, resulting in several expulsions from Bhutan's elite Sherubtse College.

Ara, the traditional alcohol of Bhutan, is most often home made from rice or maize, either fermented or distilled, and may only be legally produced and consumed privately. Ara production is unregulated in both method and quality, and its sale has been prohibited in Bhutan since a severe crackdown. However, because Ara returns far more profit than other forms of maize, many Bhutanese farmers have pressed for legal reform. The Bhutanese government, meanwhile, is intent on discouraging excessive alcohol consumption, abuse, and associated diseases through taxation and regulation.

Through government efforts to reduce ara production and consumption in Lhuntse District, eastern Bhutan, locals conceded something should be done to curb the distinctly eastern Bhutanese tradition of heavy drinking. The government's strategy is to reduce ara production and consumption gradually until it is eliminated. Alcoholism and ara production have been notable topics of political discussion Bhutan, especially at the local level. Ara, however, is also culturally relevant for its religious and medicinal uses.

=== Narcotics and treatment ===
Bhutan regulates drugs – from pharmaceuticals to narcotics – through the Narcotic Drugs and Psychotropic Substances and Substance Abuse Act 2005 ("Narcotics Act"). Its stated legislative purpose is "to ensure that drugs are available exclusively for medical, veterinary and scientific purposes." To this end, the Narcotics Act emphasizes education and treatment as means of combatting illegal drug use. The Act sets forth a fivefold schedule for substances under which Schedule I includes the most restricted substances and Schedule V includes substances "liable for abuse but [not falling] under International control."

To address drug-related issues, the Narcotics Act creates the Narcotics Control Board and the Narcotics Control Agency. The Narcotics Control Board, made up entirely of government appointees and chaired by "a relevant Cabinet Minister," is responsible for formulating drug policy, while its ancillary Narcotics Control Agency is chiefly responsible for implementing the Board's policy and advising the Board. The Narcotics Act provides enforcement and investigation powers to drug enforcement agencies, including the Royal Bhutan Police and Narcotics Control Agency. Under the Narcotics Act, every person and entity is subject to inspection by competent authorities.

The Narcotics Act mandates drug treatment under the auspices of the Narcotics Control Board and punishes repeat offenders and those who otherwise fail to abide by the terms of treatment. The Board is bound to ensure treatment, rehabilitation, and social reintegration of drug-dependent persons, through interventions, counseling, and detoxification; it is thus required by law to maintain adequate personnel and institutions to provide such services. Records of treatment must be kept confidential. Persons dependent on drugs are subject to compulsory treatment and rehabilitation; those who refuse to submit voluntarily must be confined in criminal custody.

The Act authorizes courts to impose treatment as part of sentencing in cases related to drugs, and provides for probation-like "periodic attendance before a panel for review and evaluation of treatment and progress." Successful compliance with such a regimen allows courts to discharge other penalties related to narcotics, such as prison terms and fines. The Narcotics Act further sets forth about a dozen offenses and penalties regarding compliance with the Act, further supplementing the Penal Code.

The Bhutanese media, for its part, have recognized dire societal problems resulting from and associated with substance and alcohol abuse. In response, the Bhutan Observer has encouraged religious and community support for those seeking recovery.

=== Suicide ===
Bhutan's suicide rate was 16.2 per 100,000 people in 2011. This figure ranks the kingdom as the 20th-highest suicide rate in the world, and the 6th highest in the Asia-Pacific region.

Since 2011, the number of recorded deaths has increased by around 50% for the years 2012 and 2013, which clearly places the Himalayan Kingdom among the countries with the highest suicide rates in the world. Bhutan is currently rated at number five in the Asia Region. While no clear indications are given for Bhutan's high rate of suicide, lack of job opportunities, an extremely high percentage of broken families and a high rate of domestic violence are considered to be major contributing factors.

== History ==
Development of life expectancy in Bhutan

Bhutanese health care development accelerated in the early 1960s with the establishment of the Department of Public Health and the opening of new hospitals and dispensaries throughout the country. By the early 1990s, health care was provided through twenty-nine general hospitals (including five leprosy hospitals, three army hospitals, and one mobile hospital), forty-six dispensaries, sixty-seven basic health units, four indigenous-medicine dispensaries, and fifteen malaria eradication centers. The major hospitals were in Thimphu, Geylegphug, and Trashigang. Hospital beds in 1988 totaled 932. There was a severe shortage of health care personnel with official statistics reporting only 142 physicians and 678 paramedics, about one health care professional for every 2,000 people, or only one physician for almost 10,000 people.

Training for health care assistants, nurses' aides, midwives, and primary health care workers was provided at the Royal Institute of Health Sciences associated with the Jigme Dorji Wangchuck National Referral Hospital, which was established in 1974. Graduates of the school were the core of the national public health system and helped staff the primary care basic health units throughout the country. Additional health care workers were recruited from among volunteers in villages to supplement primary health care.

The government has maintained a system of universal health care for its citizens. However, the number of Hospitals in Bhutan has been limited, and some diseases, such as cancer cannot be treated in Bhutan. Patients that cannot be treated in Bhutan are taken to hospitals in India, and their treatment is paid for by the government of Bhutan.

The most common diseases in the 1980s were gastrointestinal infections caused by waterborne parasites, mostly attributable to the lack of clean drinking water. The most frequently treated diseases were respiratory tract infections, diarrhea and dysentery, worms, skin infections, malaria, nutritional deficiencies, and conjunctivitis. In 1977 the World Health Organization (WHO) declared Bhutan a smallpox-free zone. In 1979 a nationwide immunization program was established. In 1987, with WHO support, the government envisioned plans to immunize all children against diphtheria, pertussis, tetanus, polio, tuberculosis, and measles by 1990. The government's major medical objective by 2000 was to eliminate waterborne parasites, diarrhea and dysentery, malaria, tuberculosis, pneumonia, and goiter. Progress in leprosy eradication was made in the 1970s and 1980s, during which time the number of patients had decreased by more than half, and by 1988 the government was optimistic that the disease could be eliminated by 2000.

It was estimated in 1988 that only 8 persons per 1,000 had access to potable water. Despite improved amenities provided to the people through government economic development programs, Bhutan still faced basic health problems. Factors in the country's high morbidity and death rates included the severe climate, less than hygienic living conditions, for example long-closed-up living quarters during the winter, a situation that contributes to the high incidence of leprosy, and smoke inhalation from inadequately ventilated cooking equipment. Nevertheless, in 1980 it was estimated that 90 percent of Bhutanese received an adequate daily caloric intake.

Although there were no reported cases of acquired immune deficiency syndrome (AIDS) through the early 1990s, the Department of Public Health set up a public awareness program in 1987. With the encouragement of the WHO, a "reference laboratory" was established at the Thimphu General Hospital to test for AIDS and human immunodeficiency virus (HIV) as a precautionary measure. To further enhance awareness, representatives of the National Institute of Family Health were sent to Bangladesh in 1990 for training in AIDS awareness and treatment measures.

== See also ==
- Jigme Dorji Wangchuck National Referral Hospital (Thimphu), Bhutan's main hospital
- Abortion in Bhutan
- Tobacco Control Act of Bhutan 2010
- Traditional Tibetan medicine
- Pema Dorji, a doctor of traditional Bhutanese and Tibetan medicine, the first person to institutionalize traditional medicine in Bhutan
