= College of Agriculture and Natural Resources =

College of Agriculture and Natural Resources may refer to:

- College of Agriculture and Natural Resources (Kwame Nkrumah University of Science and Technology), in Ghana
- University of Maryland College of Agriculture and Natural Resources, in the US

== See also ==
- List of agricultural universities and colleges
- List of colleges of natural resources
