= Beyond the Sky and Earth =

1999 book by Jamie Zeppa

- Author: Jamie Zeppa
- Published: 1999
- Publisher: The Berkley Publishing Group, Penguin Putnam, Inc.
- ISBN: 978-1-101-17420-3

Beyond the Sky and Earth or Beyond the Sky and the Earth: A Journey into Bhutan is a memoir written by Jamie Zeppa of her experience working as a lecturer in English at the Sherubtse College near Trashigang in eastern Bhutan. Zeppa took up an assignment for two years. Initially she started writing a fiction based on her experience there, but she was suggested to write it in memoir form and she took the advice. The book was first published in 1999. The title of the book is derived from an expression of thankfulness in the Bhutanese language which means "I am thankful to you beyond the earth and sky". Sky and Earth was on the Maclean's bestseller list.

== Content ==
Zeppa dedicates the book to her grandfather Patrick Raymond Zeppa and her grandmother Florence Alize Zeppa, who were immigrants from Poland settled in Canada. It is her first book on her experiences of working as a lecturer in English in a school in Bhutan, the tantric Buddhist kingdom in eastern Himalayas. She provides extensive knowledge about the country which till the early 1960s was not even connected by road links and was dependent only on barter trade, and its people were ruled by a king. The book is divided into six chapters (Arrival, Entrance, Movement Order, Peak of Higher Learning, Involvement and Love) followed by a postscript.

In the first chapter, Arrival, she narrates about her initial education in Toronto, Canada under the care of her paternal grandparents, as her parents had separated when she was two years old; her decision not to pursue a doctoral degree in English but take up a job as an English lecturer on a two-year assignment in a school in Bhutan. in response to an ad posted by the World University Service of Canada; her grandfather's skepticism about her taking up this assignment in an alien land, her departure from Canada and arriving at the Paro Airport in Bhutan after a bumpy air journey.

In the subsequent chapters she narrates about the Himalayan topography of the isolated valleys, the Bhutanese people, history of Buddhism in the country, the religious affiliation of the people to the Bon religion of shamanistic beliefs, their social customs, etiquette, food habits, poor hygienic conditions, her posting in the Sherubtse College near Trashigang in eastern Bhutan, her love life and so forth. She explains about Buddha and his teachings. She also explains the experiences of fellow teachers from foreign countries with humorous epithets like "night-hunting" (furtive entry into a girl's house in the night), "vomit-comet" (journey in a bus which stinks), "from scabies to rabies" (health conditions) and "Dysentery Danishes" (about the type of food they get). She gives vivid account of facts and events that happened during her teaching assignment at the Sherubtse College, located in Kanglung village near Trashigang; this college, the first in Bhutan, had been established by the Jesuit priest Father William Mackey in the 1970s.

== Reception ==
The book received mainly positive reviews. According to Steve Waters, "the book Beyond the Sky and the Earth is much more than a travel book. It is an effort to bring out her experience in Bhutan working as a teacher in the land of blind beliefs in ghosts and bad omens and supernatural forces". Waters notes that "Zeppa, with her literary talent, presents her personal experience in Bhutan in a prose that brings out the spiritual atmosphere of devotees turning the Buddhist prayer wheels in a pervading religious setting of burning of incense and lighted yak-butter lamps". Waters also comments that Zeppa's language "has a rhythm with hymns chanted by the monks and brings out the ethos of the karma theory of the country".

Laurie Park, in the review published in the "Story Circle Book Reviews", has observed that Zeppa's narration, well presented, is not only absorbing but also amusing. Park, tracing Zeppa's background of living in Canada, states that the description of her early stages of stay in Bhutan with misgivings is a contrast to her later narration of her personal involvement with the culture of the country.

Laurie also observes that Zeppa's writings juxtaposing her previous life to her acquired experience in mystic Bhutan resonates with readers perceptions after reading the book. According to Laurie, she brings out her views on the political uncertainty in the country, which was a contrast to her own cultural upbringing, and then her own personal association followed by conversion to Buddhism and its practices.

Kirkus Reviews found the book alluring and Zeppa's ardor for Bhutan and its people very miasmic and provides insight of her involvement with the exciting Bhutanese culture.

In the Publishers Weekly review, it was written—

Zeppa's telling of her clumsy attempts to adapt rings with sincerity and inspires sincerity.... {Her} lucid descriptions of the craggy terrain and hones respect for the daily struggles of the natives bring the tiny land to life in a way that is reverent but real. A lively tale.

== Awards ==
Zeppa's book has been translated into seven languages. It has been published in ten countries. In 1999, she was the recipient of the Banff Mountain Book Festival Award for her book.

== Bibliography ==
- Mayhew, Bradley; Brown, Lindsay; Mahapatra, Anirban (1 June 2012). Lonely Planet Bhutan. Lonely Planet. ISBN 978-1-74220-456-7.
- Sharma, Seema (18 June 2014). India Junction. Rupa. ISBN 978-81-291-3432-5.
- Zeppa, Jamie (1 May 2000). Beyond the Sky and the Earth: A Journey into Bhutan. Penguin Publishing Group. ISBN 978-1-101-17420-3.
