= Jigme Dorji Wangchuck National Referral Hospital =

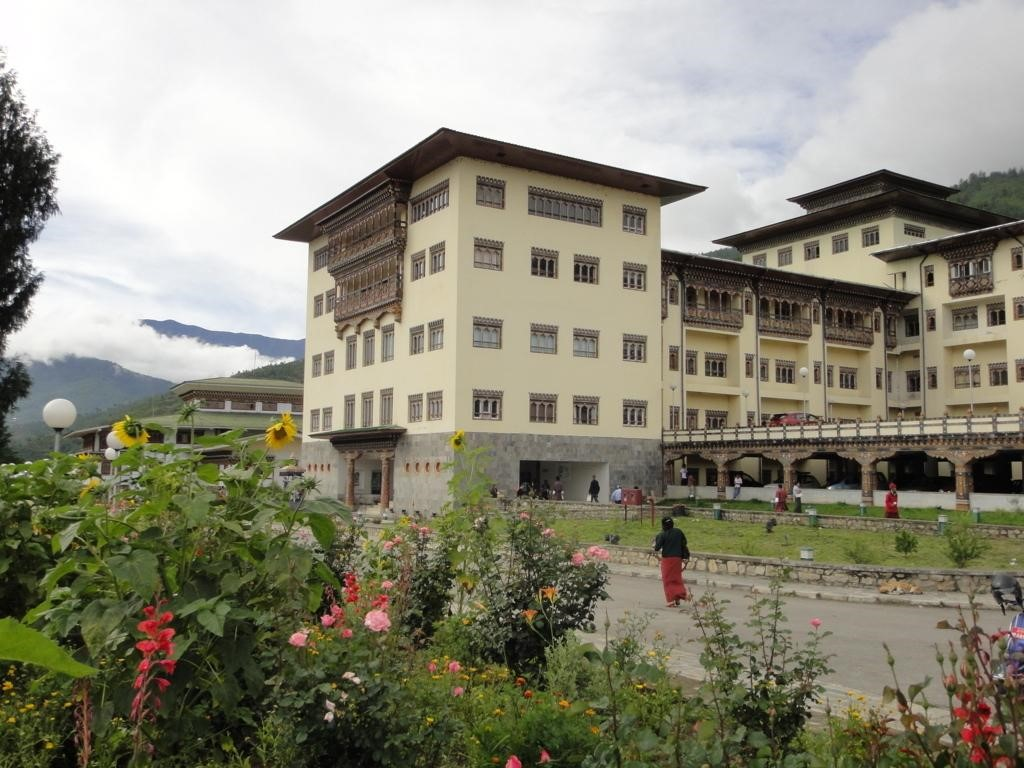

Geography
- Location: Thimphu, Bhutan
- Coordinates: 27°27′53″N 89°38′14″E

Organisation
- Care system: Ministry of Health, Royal Government of Bhutan
- Type: District General, Teaching
- Affiliated university: Royal Institute of Health Sciences of Royal University of Bhutan

Services
- Emergency department: Yes
- Beds: 350

History
- Founded: 1974; 52 years ago

Links
- Website: www.jdwnrh.gov.bt
- Lists: Hospitals in Bhutan

The National Referral Hospital (full name Jigme Dorji Wangchuck National Referral Hospital) is the public hospital of Bhutan, located in the capital of Bhutan, Thimphu. Since it was established in 1972, the hospital has been supplying free basic medical treatment as well as advanced surgeries and emergency services to citizens from all over the country. It provides the most sophisticated health evaluation and management services in the country. Recently the hospital has added CT and MRI diagnosis equipment and improved lab services. The hospital has a library with many current textbooks.

The hospital is one of five medical service centers within Thimphu. There are two more hospitals, one is the Military Hospital, Lungtenphu managed by the Royal Bhutan Army and the other one is Indo-Bhutan Friendship hospital in the main town of Thimphu, managed by the Indian Military Training Team (IMTRAT). There is a Basic Health Unit (BHU) at Dechencholing and an Outreach Clinic in Motithang and Hejo

== Vision ==
"A Centre of excellence in Healthcare Services and Medical Education."

== Mission ==
- To Provide Quality Healthcare Service Which is Safe, Efficient, Effective, Equitable and Sustainable.
- To Provide Quality Medical Education.

== Services ==
Hospital provides the following services:

1. Emergency services
2. Out patient,
3. Inpatient services
4. Preventive and promotive services
5. Rehabilitative services
6. Special Clinics
7. MERU(Medical Education & Research Unit)

== Departments ==
=== Clinical departments ===
- Department of Anesthesiology
- Department of Dentistry
- Department of Dermatology
- Emergency Department
- Department of ENT
- Forensic Medicine Department
- Department of Obstetrics and Gynecology
- Department of Medicine
- Department of Ophthalmology
- Department of Orthopaedics
- Department of Paediatrics
- Psychiatry Department
- Surgical Department

=== Other departments ===
- Community Health Department
- Department of Pharmacy
- Department of Physiotherapy
- Department of Pathology & Laboratory Medicine
- Department of Radio-Diagnosis & Imaging

== Health issues ==
In 1991 the most prevalent diseases in Bhutan in order of seriousness were respiratory tract infections, diarrhoea/dysentery, skin infections, worm infections, malaria, conjunctivitis, peptic ulcer syndrome, otitis media, tooth and gum diseases, urinary tract infections and nephritis, childhood diseases, sexually transmitted diseases, diseases of the female genital tract and complications in pregnancy and childbirth puerperium.

The Obstetrics and Gynaecology Department handles about 3,000 deliveries annually. However, with growing demand, the existing worn-out equipment is insufficient in quantity and quality. Difficulties of proper monitoring and timely intervention has led to avoidable caesarean operations and stillbirths on rare occasions. Recently, assisted by the government of Japan, the department has been able to obtain new equipment including vacuum sets for delivery, phototherapy machines, infant warmers, foetal dopplers, CTG machines and ultrasound.

Alcohol-related liver disease has been a major cause of death in Bhutan during recent years. Health ministry statistics showed that 98 of 1,471 patients in Thimpu Referral Hospital died of this cause in 2007. The hospital admitted around the same number of patients in 2008, but better medication helped lower the death rate.

Between four and ten cases relating to domestic violence affecting women from all walks of life are reported to the hospital every day. Jealousy, intoxication, and financial problems seem to be the main causes.

In October 2008, the hospital detected the first case of dengue fever of resident of the capital in a 63-year-old woman. The woman was admitted to hospital on September 2 with fever and pain in the limbs.

== Replacement facility ==
In the late 1990s, a plan was launched to upgrade the 175-bed Jigme Dorji Wangchuck Hospital to a national referral hospital with assistance from the government of India. After study, the existing structure was found to be too weak to upgrade. The planners proposed a new 350-bed hospital. By 2002 a lab building, compound wall, gift shop, doctors and nurses quarter and internal road has been completed. The project was planned to be complete by the end of 2007, but there have been delays in construction.

The hospital’s congested maternity ward, with limited staff and space, will have a better working environment once the new hospital is opened with a larger maternity ward with more staff and better technical facilities. This was funded in part by the government of Japan.

== Related organizations ==
=== Royal Institute of Health Sciences ===
The Royal Institute of Health Sciences (RIHS) is one of two main medical education centers in Bhutan, the other being the National Institute of Traditional Medicine. The RIHS was established in Thimpu in 1974 as a member college of the Royal University of Bhutan, and is associated with the Thimpu Referral Hospital. The RIHS offers diploma and certificate programmes for nurses, medical technicians and other primary health care workers.

=== Planned Medical College ===
A medical college is planned to provide training for doctors at the hospital, assisted by the All India Institute of Medical Sciences. The college will offer MBBS courses, and have an intake capacity of not more than 50 students. About 20 subject departments will be needed. Bhutan does not yet have anatomy, physiology and biochemistry departments. The health ministry is working on the process of linking post graduate programmes for the students and to ensure that the medical college is widely recognized. Health officials said that the government should also look at remuneration and incentives to attract more doctors and specialists to take up the extra work of teaching and practising medicine.

=== JDWNRH Welfare Home ===
Patients from rural areas seeking treatment often have trouble finding an affordable place to stay. The JDWNRH Welfare Home was established by Her Royal Highness Ashi Kesang Wangmo Wangchuk to provide free shelter for poor patients from distant places. The home accommodates an average of 30 patients daily. It is supported by the Bhutan Foundation, which provides beds, linens, curtains, basic furniture, and hot water facilities.

== See also ==
- Health in Bhutan
