= Khesar Gyalpo University of Medical Sciences of Bhutan =

Khesar Gyalpo University of Medical Science
- གེ་སར་རྒྱལ་པོ་གསོ་རིག་གཙུག་ལག་སློབ་སྡེ
- Type: Public
- Established: 2013; 13 years ago
- President: Dr. Pem Namgyal
- Students: 2,171
- Location: Thimphu, Bhutan
- Website: https://www.kgumsb.edu.bt/

The Khesar Gyalpo University of Medical Sciences of Bhutan (KGUMSB) (Dzongkha: གེ་སར་རྒྱལ་པོ་གསོ་རིག་གཙུག་ལག་སློབ་སྡེ) is a medical university located in Thimphu, Bhutan. Founded in 2013, it is the first medical university to be established in Bhutan.

== History ==
In 2012, the Parliament of Bhutan passed the University of Medical Sciences Act of Bhutan 2012, thereby establishing the University of Medical Sciences of Bhutan. Unlike the Royal University of Bhutan, founded in 2003, which educates across a variety of disciplines, the University of Medical Sciences was designed as a university specifically dedicated to the urgent training of medical professionals, such as nurses and doctors.

The medical school, founded in Thimphu in 2013, was renamed Khesar Gyalpo University of Medical Sciences (KGUMSB) in 2015 in honor of the ruling Druk Gyalpo. The MoU between the Ministry of Health and the University was signed to strengthen the programmes further.

== Colleges ==
There are two colleges that are under the KGUMSB:

- Royal Institute of Health Sciences
- Institute of Traditional Medicine Services

Center of Excellence in Nutrition:

Along with Bhutan's Ministry of Health supported by UNICEF Regional office, The university incubated and opened the Center of excellence in nutrition.

== Faculties ==
The KGUMSB has three faculties:

- Faculty of Traditional Medicine (FoTM) with 27 employees and 90 students.
- Faculty of Health Sciences (FNPH) with 132 employees and 430 students.
- Faculty of Postgraduate Medicine (FoPGM) with 22 employees, 63 participating physicians and 31 students. It awards the MD degree after four years of training.

== Events ==
Regular international conferences are held at the University on various issues.
