= List of colleges of natural resources =

This is a list of colleges of natural resources around the world, offering bachelor's, master's or doctoral degrees in natural resource science, natural resource management, or related fields.

== Austria ==
- University of Natural Resources and Life Sciences, Vienna

== Bhutan ==
- College of Natural Resources, Royal University of Bhutan, Lobesa, Punakha District

== Canada ==
- Faculty of Natural Resources Management, Lakehead University
- Faculty of Natural Resources Management, University of Northern British Columbia

== Ethiopia ==
- Wondo Genet College of Forestry and Natural Resources, Hawassa University

== Ghana ==
- College of Agriculture and Natural Resources, Kwame Nkrumah University of Science and Technology
- Department of Renewable Natural Resources, University for Development Studies

== India ==
- College of Fisheries, Mangalore, Karnataka

== Iran ==
- Gorgan University of Agricultural Sciences and Natural Resources

== Norway ==
- Department of Ecology and Natural Resources, Norwegian University of Life Sciences

== Philippines ==
- College of Agricultural Sciences and Natural Resources, Caraga State University
- University of the Philippines Los Baños College of Forestry and Natural Resources
- College of Forestry and Natural Resources, Visayas State University

== Sudan ==
- College of Natural Resources and Environmental Studies, University of Juba
- Faculty of Natural Resources and Environmental Studies, University of Kordofan

== Taiwan ==
- College of Environmental Studies and Oceanography, National Dong Hwa University
  - Department of Natural Resources and Environmental Studies
  - Master program of Humanity and Environmental Science
- Department of Forestry and Natural Resources, National Chiayi University
- Department of Forestry and Natural Resources, National Ilan University

== United Kingdom ==
- School of the Environment, Natural Resources and Geography, Bangor University

== United States ==
=== Northeast ===
- Division of Forestry, Natural Resources, and Recreation, Paul Smith's College
- College of Agriculture, Health, and Natural Resources, University of Connecticut
- College of Natural Sciences, Forestry and Agriculture, University of Maine
- College of Agriculture and Natural Resources, University of Maryland
- Department of Natural Resources Conservation, University of Massachusetts Amherst
- Department of Natural Resources and the Environment, University of New Hampshire
- Department of Forest and Natural Resources Management, SUNY College of Environmental Science and Forestry
- Rubenstein School of Environment and Natural Resources, The University of Vermont

=== Midwest ===
- Department of Natural Resources and Environmental Sciences, University of Illinois at Urbana–Champaign
- Department of Forestry and Natural Resources, Purdue University
- Department of Natural Resource Ecology and Management, Iowa State University
- School of Natural Resources & Environment, University of Michigan
- College of Food, Agricultural and Natural Resource Sciences, University of Minnesota
- College of Agriculture, Food and Natural Resources, University of Missouri
- School of Natural Resources, Ohio State University
- College of Natural Resources, University of Wisconsin–Stevens Point
- College of Agricultural Sciences and Natural Resources, University of Nebraska–Lincoln
- School of Natural Resource Sciences, North Dakota State University

=== South ===
- School of Renewable Natural Resources, Louisiana State University
- College of Natural Resources, North Carolina State University
- Department of Natural Resource Ecology and Management, Oklahoma State University
- Daniel B. Warnell School of Forestry and Natural Resources, University of Georgia
- College of Natural Resources and Environment, Virginia Tech
- College of Forest Resources, Mississippi State University

=== West ===
- College of Forestry, Oregon State University
- Department of Natural Resources Management, California Polytechnic State University
- College of Agricultural Sciences and Natural Resources, Oklahoma State University
- College of Agricultural Sciences and Natural Resources, Texas Tech University
- College of Natural Resources, University of California, Berkeley
- College of Natural Resources, Department of Forest Ecology and Biogeosciences, University of Idaho
- The Helga Otto Haub School of Environment and Natural Resources, University of Wyoming
- College of Agricultural, Human, and Natural Resource Sciences, Washington State University
- Quinney College of Natural Resources, Utah State University
- Warner College of Natural Resources, Colorado State University

== See also ==
- List of agricultural universities and colleges
- List of forestry universities and colleges
- List of schools of mines
