= Abortion in Bhutan =

Abortion in Bhutan is only legal when the pregnancy is the result of rape or incest, or if it is necessary to preserve the woman's mental health, or to save her life. Despite this, the United Nations report on abortion notes that the exact status of the country's abortion law is uncertain: "Because the state religion of Bhutan is Buddhism, which disapproves of abortion, it is probable that the procedure is allowed only to save the life of the pregnant woman."

== Impact ==
Since abortions are difficult for women to obtain in Bhutan, they often cross the border into India, where they get abortions in unsafe conditions. The danger and resulting fatalities has led many people to push for the legalization and decriminalization of abortion for Bhutanese women.

== See also ==
- Health in Bhutan
- Women in Bhutan
