= Gyalpozhing College of Information Technology =

Higher education institution in Bhutan

Coordinates: 27°32′09″N 89°39′58″E

- རྒྱལ་པོའི་ཞིང་བརྡ་དོན་འཕྲུལ་རིག་མཐོ་རིམ་སློབ་གྲྭ་
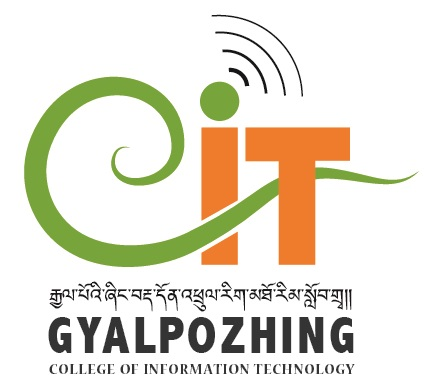
- Other names: GCIT
- Type: Public
- Established: 2017
- Chancellor: His Majesty The King Jigme Khesar Namgyel Wangchuck
- President: Audrey Low
- Vice-Chancellor: Dasho Nidup Dorji
- Location: Thimphu, Bhutan
- Website: https://www.gcit.edu.bt/

The Gyalpozhing College of Information Technology(GCIT) (Dzongkha: རྒྱལ་པོའི་ཞིང་བརྡ་དོན་འཕྲུལ་རིག་མཐོ་རིམ་སློབ་གྲྭ་; Wylie: 'brug rgyal-'dzin gtsug-lag-slob-sde), was established on October 6, 2017 in Mongar, Bhutan, as part of the Royal University of Bhutan. The college currently offers a Bachelor of Computer science in AI Development and Data Science, Blockchain Development, Full Stack Development and Bachelor of Interactive Design and Development programme.
