= Choida Jamtsho =

Bhutanese politician (1965–2021)

Member of the National Assembly
- In office 31 October 2018 – 18 April 2021
- Succeeded by: Karma Dorji
- Constituency: Nganglam
- In office 2013–2018
- Constituency: Nganglam
- In office 2008–2013
- Constituency: Nganglam

Personal details
- Born: 17 March 1965
- Died: 18 April 2021 (aged 56)
- Party: Druk Phuensum Tshogpa (DPT)
- Education: Sherubtse College; University of East Anglia

Choida Jamtsho (17 March 1965 — 18 April 2021) was a Bhutanese politician who had been a member of the National Assembly of Bhutan, since October 2018. Previously, he was a member of the National Assembly of Bhutan from 2008 to 2013 and again from 2013 to 2018.

== Education ==
He was educated at Sherubtse College, Bhutan (Bachelor of Commerce, 1989) and the University of East Anglia (MSc Environmental Sciences, 2006).

== Political career ==
He was elected to the National Assembly of Bhutan as a candidate of DPT from Nganglam constituency in 2008 and 2013 elections.

He was re-elected to the National Assembly of Bhutan as a candidate of DPT from Nganglam constituency in 2018 Bhutanese National Assembly election. He received 3576 votes and defeated Karma Dorji, a candidate of DNT.

Jamtsho died in April 2021 from food poisoning.
