= Gedu, Bhutan =

Gedu རྒིད་འདུ་
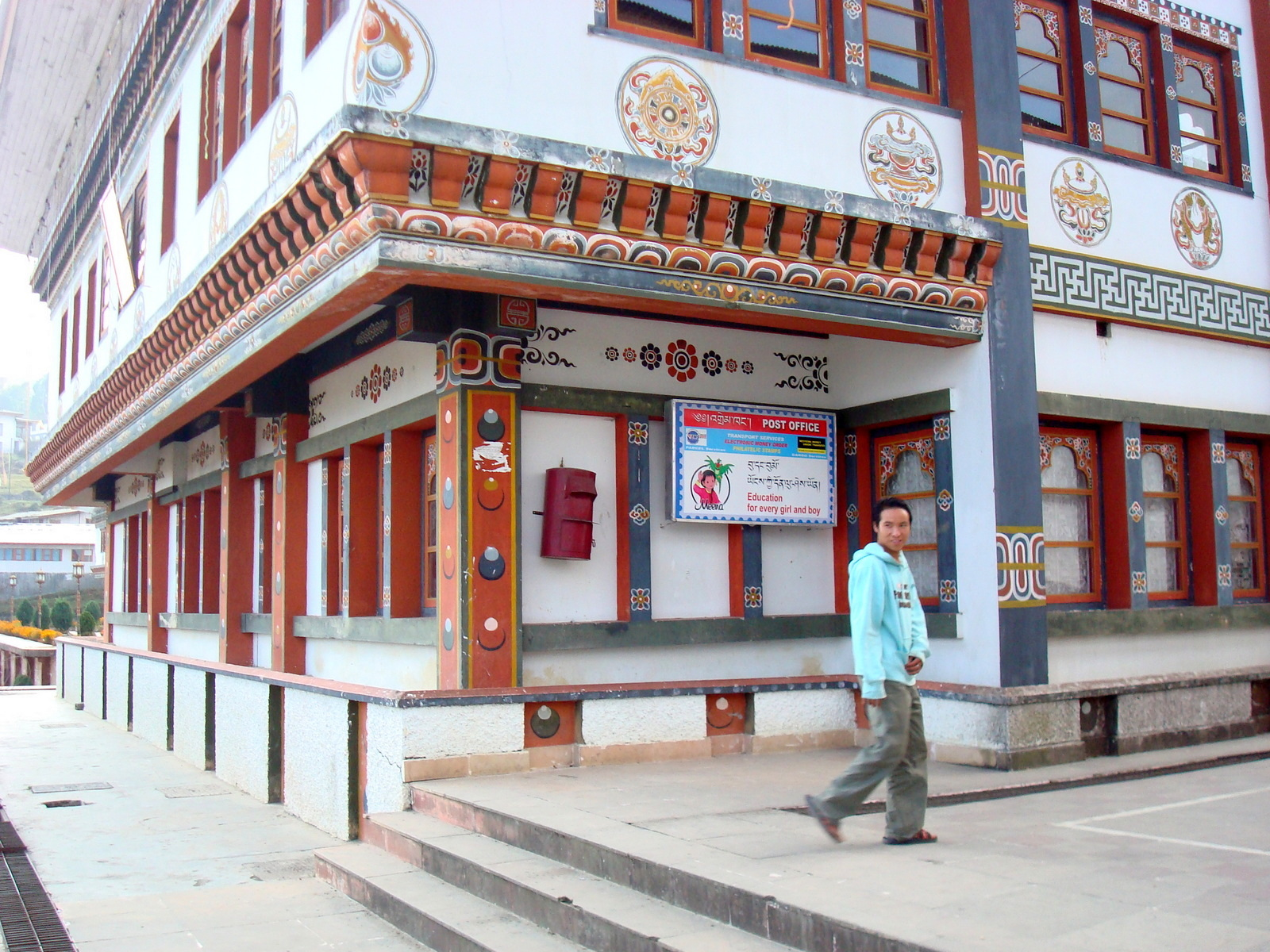
- Post office building of Gedu

- Location in Bhutan
- Coordinates: 26°55′48″N 89°30′0″E
- Country: Bhutan
- District: Chukha District

Population (2012)
  - Total: 4,993
- Time zone: UTC+6
  - Summer (DST): Bhutan
- Bhutan Post: 21006
- Area code: 05
- Website: http://chhukha.gov.bt/news.php

Gedu, also transliterated as Gaedu, is a town located in the Chukha District in south-western Bhutan. The Gedu College of Business Studies, one of the colleges of the Royal University of Bhutan, is located in Gedu.

Population 4,288 (2005 census).

== Economy ==
The economy is growing quickly largely due to the Tala Hydroelectric Project Authority (THPA) project which started in 1998, which saw substantial migration to Gedu, with thousands of workers looking for jobs.

Infrastructure and facilities have increased over the last few years to cater for the new population. Before 1997, the town was a village with no telephones or STD facilities. THPA has constructed over 840 units of apartments in the town and has spent roughly Nu 897.117 million on the buildings including the new high school for 1300 students, sports facilities and a 20-bed hospital with five doctors serving the district.

A total of 122 kilometres of roads were constructed at a cost of about Nu 1222 million, and 15 bridges in the town and the surrounding area at Nu 104.5 million. There is a new water treatment plant built in the town at a cost of Nu 30 million. The plant has a storage capacity of 707,600 litres.
