= Sherubtse College =

College in Bhutan

- Type: Government College
- Established: 1966
- President: Tshering Wangdi
- Students: 1300
- Location: Kanglung, Trashigang, Bhutan; 27.2871°N 91.5237°E
- Campus: Urban
- Website: www.sherubtse.edu.bt

Sherubtse College
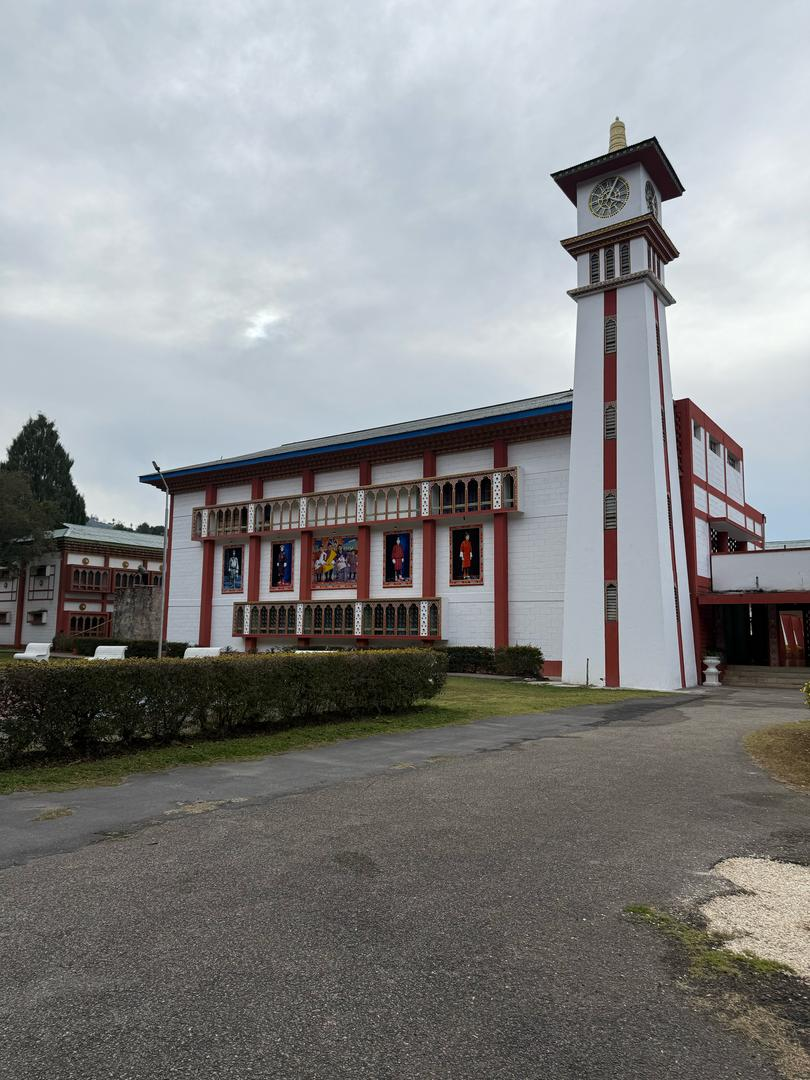
- The clock tower and main academic block of Sherubtse College

Sherubtse College is the first accredited college in Bhutan, founded in 1966 by a group of Jesuits under the leadership of Father William Mackey. The college was affiliated to the University of Delhi by a special act of the Indian parliament.

It became a part of the newly created Royal University of Bhutan in 2003, a system that comprises all public post-secondary schools in Bhutan.

== Departments ==
Nearly 300 students graduate every year from the college. It offers courses such as Economics, Political Science and Sociology, Life Science, English, Geography, Science, and many new courses are offered after rigorous changes in the college for more 21st-century learning. New courses including Bachelors of Economics & Political Science, Bachelors of Digital Communications & Project Management, and Bachelors of Data Science and Data Analytics have been offered since the Autumn Semester of 2023. Its most significant science department is the department of Physical Science and Environmental Science, which benefits from its location within the Himalayan region. Business Studies has been shifted to Gedu College of Business Studies (GCBS), the second government college in Bhutan located in Gedu, Chhukha Dzongkhag. This new college offers courses like Business Administration and Commerce.

== History of the College ==
The 3rd king of Bhutan, Jigme Dorji Wangchuck laid the foundation stone for Sherubtse School in June 1966. The school opened in 1968 with Father William Mackey as principal. In 1976, the school was upgraded to a Junior College with pre-university courses in science. In 1978, the arts and business courses were added.

In July 1983, Sherubtse College became an affiliated college of the Delhi University system in India and Father Gerald E. Leclaire S.J. was the first principal. Several Jesuits of Canadian origin taught English and Science.

In June 2003, the school was combined with 9 other institutes of higher learning to form the Royal University of Bhutan. The departments of business and economics are to be transferred to the Royal Institute of Management (RIM) over the next several years.

== In literature ==
In "Beyond the Sky and Earth," Jamie Zeppa provides a detailed account of her experiences teaching at Sherubtse College.

== Notable alumni ==
- Ugyen Dorji, Home Minister
- Damcho Dorji, Foreign Minister
- Kelly Dorji, film actor
- Kezang Dorji, rapper
- Choida Jamtsho, Member of the National Assembly
- Sonam Kinga, Chairperson of the National Council of Bhutan, actor and researcher at the Center for Bhutan Studies
- Wangchuk Namgyel, Speaker, National Assembly of Bhutan
- Lotay Tshering, Prime Minister of Bhutan
- Dorji Wangdi, politician

== Notable faculty ==
- William Mackey (Jesuit), educator
- George Thengummoottil, filmmaker
- Jamie Zeppa, writer, author of Beyond the Sky and Earth

== See also ==
- List of Jesuit sites
