= College of Science and Technology (Bhutan) =

Coordinates: 26.8503°N 89.3940°E

Location
- Rinchending; Phuntsholing, Bhutan; Bhutan

Information
- Type: Engineering
- Motto: In pursuit of preparing tomorrow's technologists
- Established: 2001
- President: Cheki Dorji (2011–present)
- Enrolment: approx. 200 per year
- Website: Official website

The College of Science and Technology is an engineering college under Royal University of Bhutan in Rinchending, Phuntsholing, Bhutan, that offers undergraduate as well as graduate education. The college provides bachelor's degrees in Civil Engineering, Electrical Engineering, Electronics and Communication Engineering, Information Technology Engineering, Architecture, Water Resources Engineering, Mechanical Engineering and Software Engineering as well as a Master of Engineering in Renewable Energy and Construction management. As of 2011, it was the only institution providing undergraduate education in engineering in Bhutan.

== Programs offered ==
As of July 2024, the college offers twelve programs.

The Master of Engineering in Renewable Energy and Masters of Construction Management degree are a one and a half year full-time program. The Master of Construction Management degree is a one and a half year full-time program.

The six undergraduate engineering degrees are all four-year programs with a 3-month internship:

- Bachelor of Engineering in Civil Engineering
- Bachelor of Engineering in Electrical Engineering
- Bachelor of Engineering in Electronics and Communication Engineering
- Bachelor of Engineering in Information Technology
- Bachelor of Engineering in Engineering Geology
- Bachelor of Engineering in Instrumentation and Control Engineering
- Bachelor of Engineering in Water Resources Engineering
- Bachelor of Engineering in Software Engineering
- Bachelor of Engineering in Mechanical Engineering

The Bachelor of Architecture degree is a five-year program and includes a six-month internship in the fourth year.

== Student life ==
The students of the university are involved in several extracurricular activities apart from their academic curriculum:

- Nangpai Zhenu Club serves as an interest group for young Buddhists. They participate in morning and evening prayers, rimdo and puja ceremonies, Lungta recitation, etc.
- Kuenphen Tshogpa Club serves as the philanthropic club. The members dedicate themselves to serving needy communities by collecting donations and essential goods. Once a year, members travel to a remote school to provide them with clothes, blankets, etc. Another small group within the club raises money for kidney failure patients.
- Y-Peer Club members promote awareness regarding youth and women's issues like sexual education and rights, sexual harassment, substance abuse, etc.
- Rangzhing Thuendrel Tshogpa (Nature Club) members dedicate their time to preserve nature and create mass awareness of its value.
- Radio Club operates the college's FM radio station.
- The college operates a student chapter of the Association for Computing Machinery.
- The Maintenance Club participates in maintenance activities at the college.
- Other clubs include Rovers Club, Media Club, Cultural Club, Literary Club, and GNH and BTO community service clubs.

The two most popular sports at the institute are soccer (football) and basketball. The college football ground is always crowded by lovers of these sports. The students are known for their cooperation during sporting activities wherein they all dress uniformly and cheer for their team in tournaments. The students also participate in other sports like badminton and table tennis.

All of the students and most lecturers reside on the campus. Daily meals are regulated by the student body. There are six residential buildings for students and others for lecturers. The residential area is well connected by a road to the academic buildings.
