= Kanglung =

Kanglung བཀང་ལུང་། (Dzongkha)
- Location in Bhutan
- Coordinates: 27°17′24″N 91°32′24″E
- Country: Bhutan
- District: Trashigang District

Population (2005)
  - Total: 1,717

Kanglung (Dzongkha: བཀང་ལུང་།) is a town in eastern Bhutan. It is located in Trashigang District and is the location of Sherubtse College, one of the Royal University of Bhutan's academic institutes.

At the 2005 census, its population was 1,717.

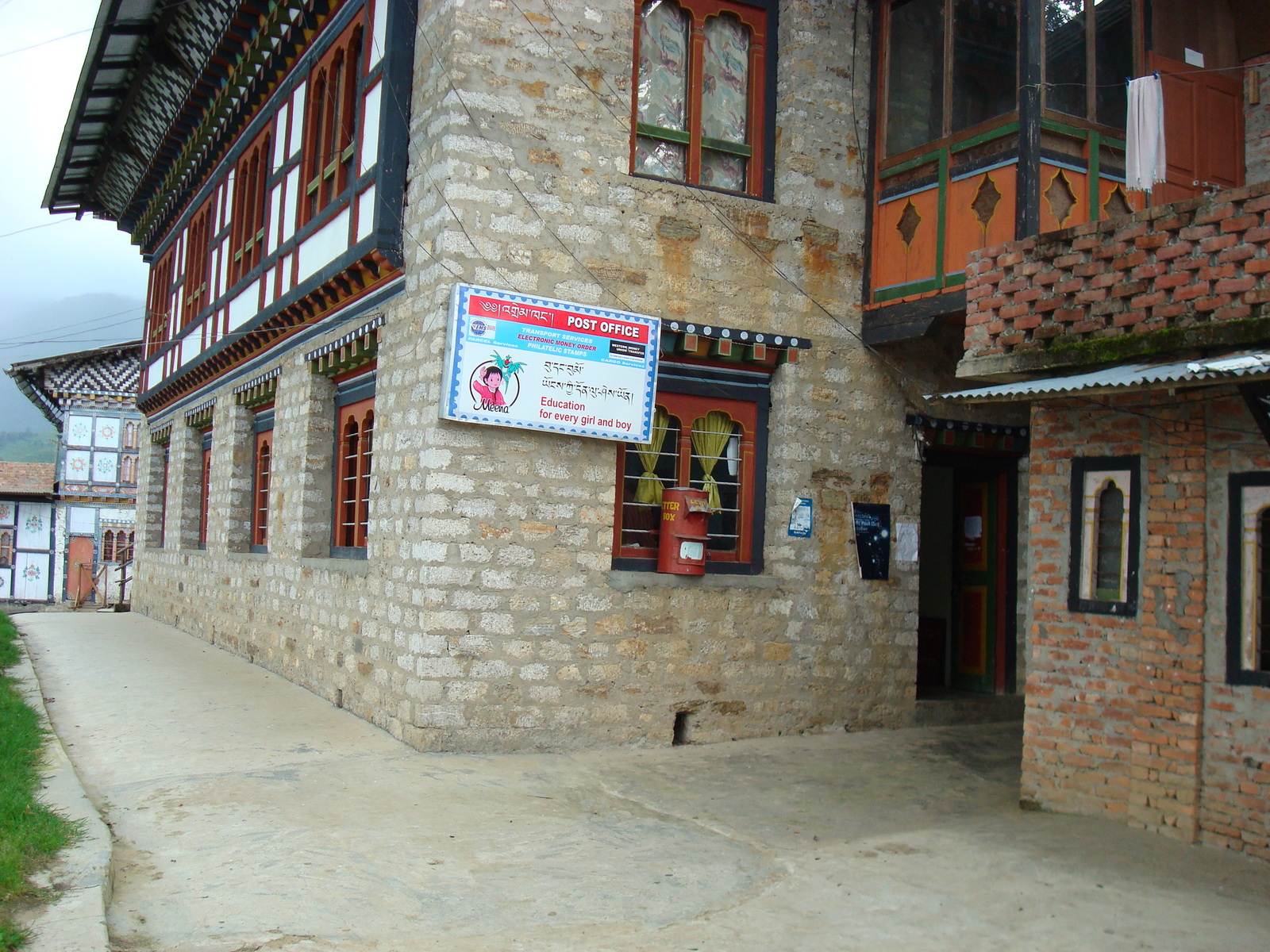
Kanglung post office, Trashigang district, Bhutan
