= Pelkhil School =

Location
- Tashi Pelkhil Village, Lungtenphu; Thimphu, Thimphu 11001; Bhutan
- Coordinates: 28.49187°N 91.60792°E

Information
- Funding type: Private
- Motto: Veritas Humilitas Integritas (Truth Humility Integrity)
- Religious affiliation: Buddhist
- Established: 2010
- School board: BCSEA and Cambridge Assessment and International Examinations
- Director: Karma L. Dorji
- Principal: Rie Katayama Dorji, MA Umesh Kumar B.Sc ,
- Staff: 40
- Gender: Co-educational
- Age: 5 to 18
- Enrolment: 600
- Average class size: 15
- Campus size: 8 acres
- Houses: 4
- Colours: Black and gold
- Mascot: Tiger
- Publication: The Pelkhil Tiger, Pelkhil Yearbook
- Website: http://www.pelkhil.edu.bt/

Pelkhil School is a private co-educational school located in Thimphu the capital of Bhutan, offering education from pre-primary until grade 12. It was founded in March 2010.

== Overview ==
The school is headed by a Board of Directors, who appoint the Principal and Faculty. There are four houses, each headed by a teacher, selected from the more senior members of the teaching staff.

Pelkhil had 700 students in 2015, with the enrollment increasing every year.

Pelkhil has 24 classrooms, four laboratories, faculty centre, conference hall, recreational hall, library, central server room, Judo dojo, music and dance room, cafeteria. It has one football field, two basketball courts, volleyball courts and a table tennis room.

== School terms ==
There are two academic terms during the calendar year. The first term begins in the third week of February and ends at the end of June. The second term begins in the third week of July and ends in the third week of December.

== Houses ==
Students are separated into houses Taag (tiger), Chhung (bird), Singye (lion) and Druk (dragon).

== Uniform ==
All students wear school uniform which consists of a grey mathra gho for boys and kira for girls. For boys the tego is white while for girls the tego is maroon with a light grey wongju. Black socks and shoes are worn.

== Sports ==
Sport is an important part of the education program offered at Pelkhil House. There are two football fields, 1 full-size futsall pitch, teqball, shooting, two basketball courts, two volleyball courts, badminton, table tennis, and one large Judo dojo. Pelkhil School was the dominating sports in school sports in all the major sports such as basketball, volleyball and football. Students from Pelkhil School have won 4 Bronze medals at the South Asian Games and many other international medals. Pelkhil School is the primary sponsor of Bhutan Judo Association, the national Judo association under Bhutan Olympic Committee, and it is also affiliated to International Judo Federation and Judo Union of Asia.

== Fees ==
In Bhutan the fee structure is approved by the Ministry of Education and kept extremely low.

== School magazines ==
The Pelkhil School Yearbook, the annual school magazine.
