= William Mackey (Jesuit) =

Canadian priest (1915–1995)

The Reverend William Joseph Mackey S.J.
- Born: 19 August 1915; Montreal, Quebec, Canada
- Died: 18 October 1995 (aged 80); Thimphu, Bhutan

Orders
- Ordination: 15 August 1945

William Joseph Mackey, S.J. (19 August 1915 – 18 October 1995) was a Canadian Catholic priest and Jesuit educator. He was responsible for establishing the modern education system in Bhutan, including its first high school (which is now its first accredited university, Sherubtse College).

== Early life ==
William Joseph Mackey was born on 19 August 1915 in Montreal, Quebec to Kitty Murphy, an Irish Catholic, and Herbert Mackey, a Protestant of Irish descent. He received a Catholic primary education and successfully applied for scholarship at Loyola College, which included a high school. He was accepted into the Society of Jesus shortly after graduating from high school and joined the St. Stanislaus Novitiate in Guelph, Ontario on 14 August 1932.

Mackey was ordained a priest on 15 August 1945 by Archbishop Joseph Charbonneau in the Immaculate Conception Church. He pronounced his final vows on 15 August 1949. In 1946, he left Canada for the Jesuit mission in Darjeeling district of India. He served there for 17 years, during which time he participated in many education programs and was headmaster of two high schools. However, he also became unpopular with local authorities, and in 1963 he was ordered to leave the country.

When the King of Bhutan, Jigme Dorji Wangchuck, learned of Mackey's imminent expulsion from India, he invited Mackey to become an educator in Bhutan, as part of that country's ongoing modernization efforts. Mackey accepted the invitation. As a preemptive measure, he had all his teeth removed, because he would have no access to modern dentistry in Bhutan.

== Life in Bhutan ==
When Mackey arrived in Bhutan in October 1963, the Jesuits became the first Roman Catholic religious order allowed in the officially-Buddhist nation. During the three decades that followed, Mackey performed no conversions of Bhutanese citizens, as that was forbidden under Bhutanese law.

His first school, in Trashigang, was based in an abandoned cowshed and had 7 students.

In 1973, Mackey was awarded the royal Druk Thuksey medal for his services to education in Bhutan. In 1985, he was granted honorary Bhutanese citizenship, and in 1988, when the Jesuits had to leave the country, their schools being taken over by the Government of Bhutan, he was allowed to remain.

Mackey died on 18 October 1995, in a hospital in Thimphu, due to an infected gum which led to blood poisoning. After his death in 1995, his obituary on Bhutanese national radio lasted 15 minutes. Despite his wishes to be buried in Bhutan, the Darjeeling Jesuits claimed his body for burial in their own cemetery.
