= Jamie Zeppa =

Canadian writer

Jamie Zeppa is the author of Beyond the Sky and the Earth: A Journey into Bhutan, which won the Banff Mountain Book Festival Award for Adventure Travel Writing, and a novel, Every Time We Say Goodbye.

== Childhood and education ==
Zeppa's parents divorced when she was young and later she was raised by her grandparents in Sault Ste. Marie.

== Career ==
At age 23, Zeppa took a job teaching English in Bhutan. She lived in Bhutan for nine years, converted from Catholicism to Buddhism, and married a former student, actor Tshewang Dendup, with whom she had a son.

She now teaches literature at Seneca College in Toronto.

== Books ==
Year	Title	Publisher	Awards
1999	Beyond the Sky and the Earth: A Journey into Bhutan	The Berkley Publishing Group, Penguin Putnam, Inc.	Banff Mountain Book Festival Award for Adventure Travel Writing
2011	Every Time We Say Goodbye	Knopf Canada	A Globe and Mail Best Book of 2011 selection
