= College of Natural Resources (Bhutan) =

College of the Royal University of Bhutan

College of Natural Resources, Royal University of Bhutan
- ༄༅།། རང་འབྱུང་འཐོན་བསྐྱེད་མཐོ་རིམ་སློབ་གྲྭ།
- Former name: Natural Resources Training Institute (NRTI)
- Motto: 'Higher learning infused with GNH values'
- Type: Public
- Established: 1992 as Natural Resources Training Institute (NRTI) and renamed as the College of Natural Resources in 2003
- President: Dr. Sonam Tashi
- Dean: Dr. Tsho Tsho (Academic Affairs); Dr. Sonam Tashi (Research and Industrial Linkages); Dr. Tandin Gyeltshen (Student Affairs)
- Faculty: 57
- Administrative staff: 42
- Students: 583 as of September 2026.
- Location: Lobesa, East West highway, Punakha, 14001, Bhutan
- Campus: 29 hectares (72 acres); Suburban
- Website: www.cnr.edu.bt

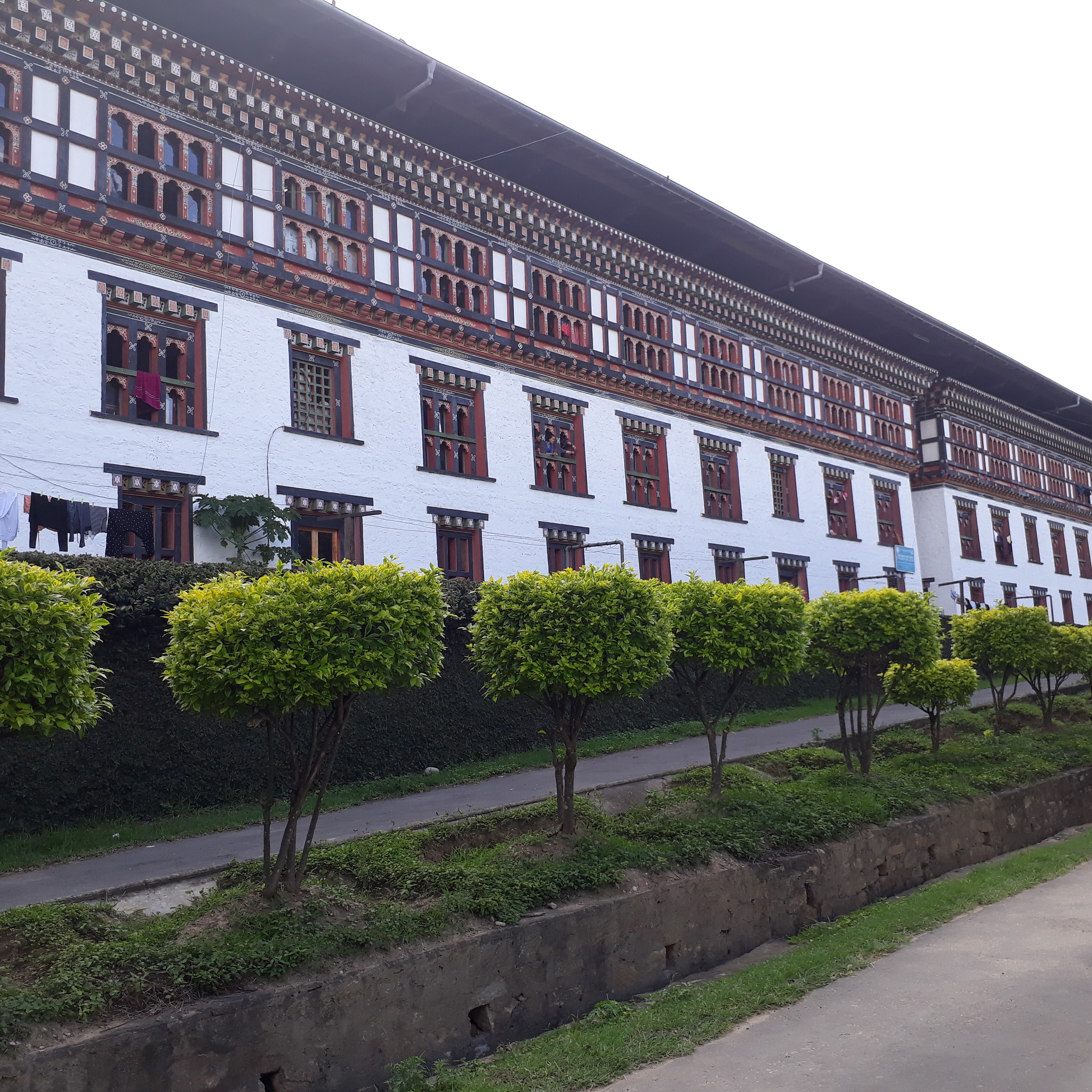
College of Natural Resources

The College of Natural Resources, (CNR RUB) is one of the nine constituent colleges under the Royal University of Bhutan offering courses on natural resources management, including agriculture, animal science, environment and climate, food science and technology, forest science conservation and sustainable development It is located in Lobesa, Punakha District, in west-central Bhutan. The college campus is spread over 98 acres (40 ha) on the eastern slope of Lobesa and is about 140 km (87 mi) away from the Paro International Airport.

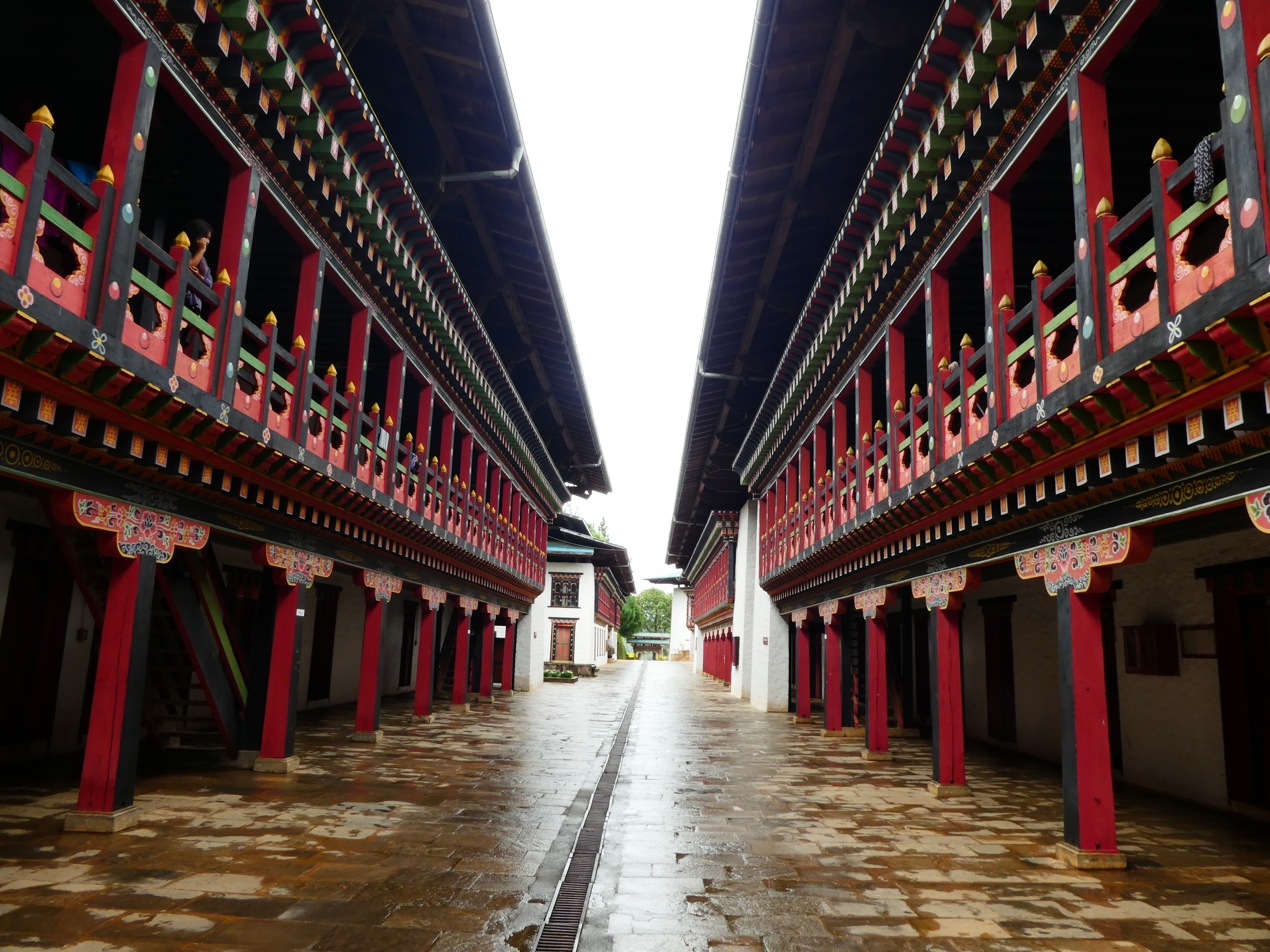

== History ==
The college was founded in 1992 as the Natural Resources Training Institute (NRTI) by then Ministry of Agriculture and Forests to train extension agents in agriculture, livestock and forestry. The training was based on the Bhutanese farming systems – Crops, livestock and forests are the integral parts of the rural livelihood systems in Bhutan. Therefore, to integrate the three domains such as crops, livestock and forests the then National Agriculture Training Institute (NATI) located at Paro, the Royal Veterinary Institute (RVI) at Serbithang and the Bhutan Forestry Institute (BFI) at Taba were brought under one umbrella and named as the Natural Resources Training Institute (NRTI) at Lobesa with funding support from Swiss Development Corporation (SDC), Helvetas and the Royal Government of Bhutan. The NRTI was under the Ministry of Agriculture and Forests until 2002. In 2003, the NRTI joined the Royal University of Bhutan (RUB) as one of the member colleges, and was named as the College of Natural Resources (CNR). As NRTI, the institute offered Diploma courses in agriculture, animal husbandry, and forestry for the mid-level extension workers of the Ministry of Agriculture and Forests until 2002. The college continued to offer Diploma courses as nested programmes after 2010, after the Bachelor programmes were introduced in agriculture, animal science, and forest science. By 2012, the college started to offer Bachelor of Science in Sustainable Development, and in July 2015, Bachelor of Science in Environment and Climate Studies was introduced. The college launched post graduate programme such as Master in Development Practice (MDP) in 2014, which is a global multidisciplinary programme. The Master of Science in Natural Resources Management by research programme (MSc NRM) was launched in 2015. Further, a Bachelor of Science in Food Science and Technology was launched in 2017, and BSc in Organic Agriculture in 2019. BSc in agriculture is replaced by BSc in organic agriculture and since 2021, the college has stopped offering BSc in agriculture Furthermore, the college started to offer Master of Science programme in Conservation Biology by Research and PhD in Climate Studies programme in March 2022. The PhD in Climate Studies programme is the first PhD programme of its kind in the Royal University of Bhutan and is hosted by the CNR.

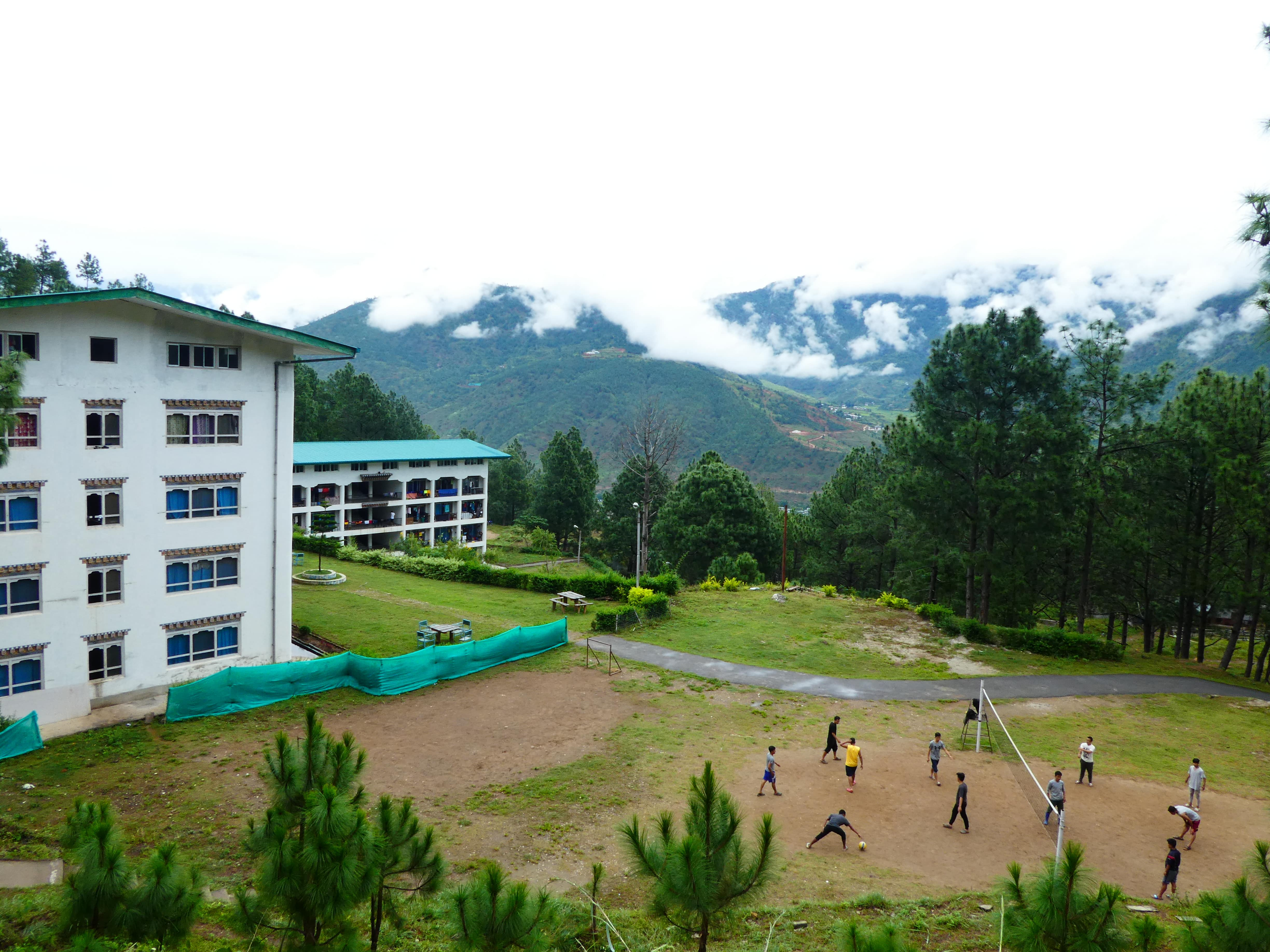
Student Accommodation, College of Natural Resources

== Accreditation ==
In 2016, the college was accredited by the Bhutan Accreditation Council (BAC), and awarded A grade

== Location ==
The College of Natural Resources is located in Lobesa, Punakha District, Bhutan, in west-central Bhutan. The college campus is spread over 98 acres (40 ha) on the eastern slope of Lobesa and is about 140 km (87 mi) away from the Paro international airport. Besides laboratories and academic buildings, the main campus includes housing, and sports a conference center, and a library with over 100,000 volumes of books and other periodicals.

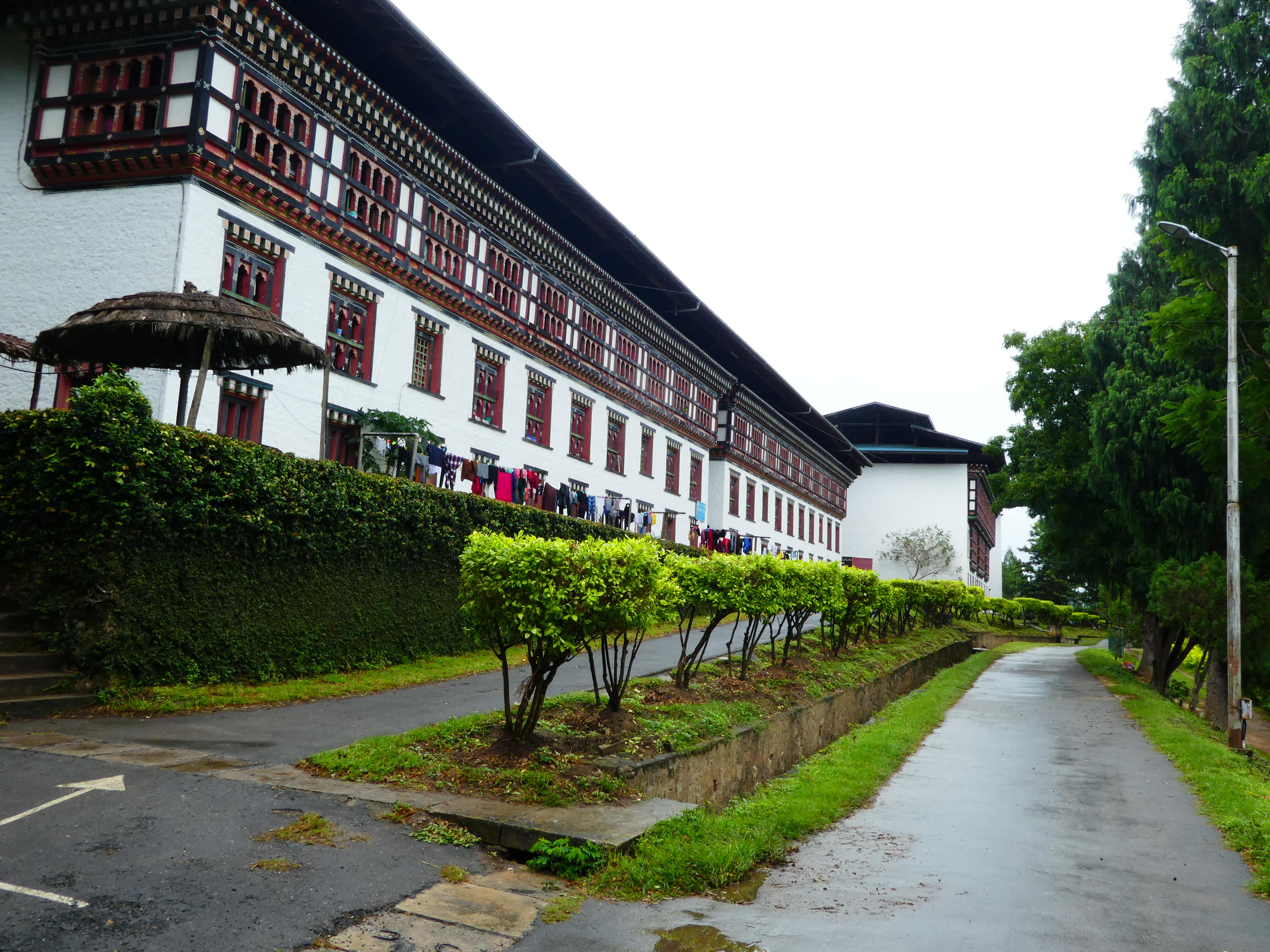
College of Natural Resources, Royal University of Bhutan

== Structure ==
CNR RUB comprises six departments and nine programs:

- Department of Agriculture, and BSc in Organic Agriculture is offered under this department.
- Department of Animal Science
- Department of Environment and Climate Studies, and home program for PhD in Climate Studies launched in January 2021.
- Department of Food Science and Technology
- Department of Forest Science, Master of Science in Natural Resources Management by Research and Master of Science in Conservation Biology by Research are offered under this department.
- Department of Sustainable Development, Master's in Development Practice is offered under this department.

== Academic programs ==
The College of Natural Resources offers PhD, Master's, Bachelor's, Diploma and Certificate courses Among the programs offered include regular Master of Science in Development Practice, Master of Science in Natural Resources Management by Research, Bachelor of Science in Animal Science Bachelor of Science in Environment and Climate Studies, Bachelor of Science in Food Science and Technology Bachelor of Science in Forest Science Bachelor of Science in Organic Agriculture and Bachelor of Science in Sustainable Development In addition, the College of Natural Resources, Royal University of Bhutan, started offering PhD in Climate Studies since February 2021 and Master of Science in Conservation Biology by Research since March 2022.

== Collaboration ==
The college has several collaboration such as: Bremen University, Germany, (Erasmus+ - SUNRAISE project), Göttingen University, Germany (Erasmus+), Palacky University, Czech Rep (Erasmus+), Pardova University, Italy (Erasmus+), Khonkaen University, Thailand (TICA) Nagoya University, Japan (JSPS), SUstainable developmeNt Smart Agriculture Capacity (SUNSpACe) with support from Erasmus+ (EU), Norwegian University of Biological Science, Norway (NORHED), Research Institute of Humanity and Nature, Kyoto, Japan (FEAST), Bangladesh Academy of Rural Development, Bangladesh, International Centre for Integrated Mountain Development (ICIMOD), Kathmandu, Nepal (TROSA), The Naturalis in Leiden, The Netherlands on Biodiversity and Nature and Wageningen Centre for Development Innovation among others (CDI). In addition to the collaboration with international the college has active collaboration with national agencies, NGOs, the college, has also signed the Memorandum of Understanding (MoU) with National Centre for Hydrology and Meteorology and is expected to have similar linkages with other agencies including civil society organizations in the future. In 2021, college signed MoU with Tarayana Foundation to collaborate on research, trainings and community services. Currently three students enrolled into the PhD in Climate Studies programme and all the students of this cohort are offered full scholarships by International Development Research Centre (IDRC) in Canada through Tarayana Foundation In 2021, The college became a member of Global Waste Cleaning Network (GWCN).

== Research and research centers ==
The college has its own online journal for publication called Bhutan Journal of Natural Resources and Development (BJNRD). The BJNRD publishes quality research articles both online and print Besides offering academic programmes, the college has three research centres namely; (1) *Centre for Environment and Climate Research (CECR), (2) **Centre for Rural Development Studies (CRDS), and (3) ***Centre for Sustainable Mountain Agriculture (CSMA). The research and publications as research output by staff and students of the college can be accessed here. The college also provides professional education, short-course training, and consultancy services

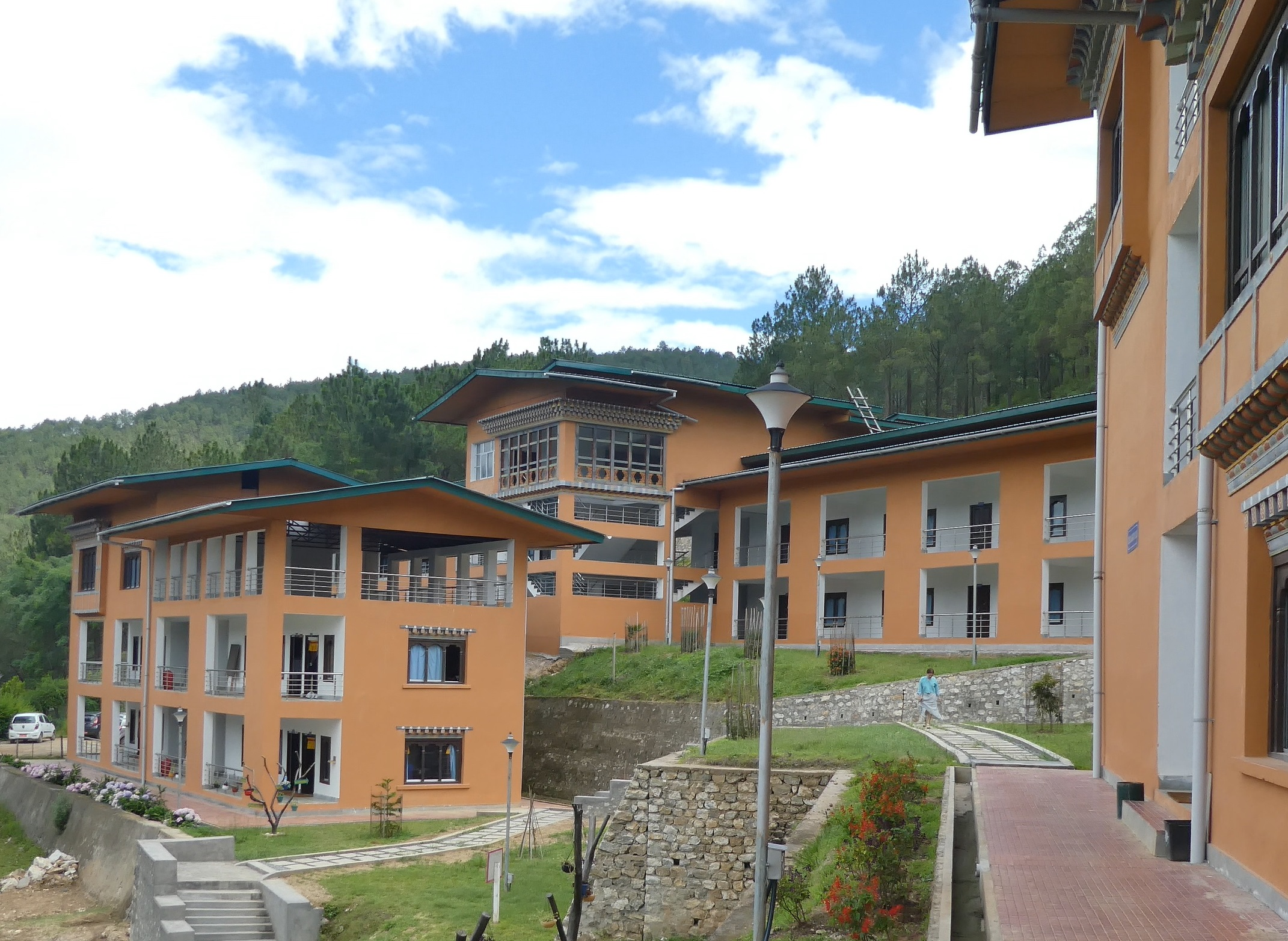
Colleges of Natural Resources, Royal University of Bhutan (New Academic Block)

== Directors and presidents ==
The present incumbent president, Dr. Sonam Tashi, former Dean of Research and Industrial Linkages who assumed assumed office on September 01, 2026. For mer President, Mr. Sonam Wangchuk completed his tenure and handed over the responsibility to the current President on the same same who assumed office on 9 August 2021. The outgoing President, Dr. Phub Dorji, completed his term as president on 30 June 2021. Dr. Phub Dorji assumed office on September 1, 2016, after his predecessor, Director General, Mr. Dorji Wangchuk, exited from the service. Until Dr. Phub Dorji assumed office, the position title was known as the Director or Director General based on the seniority; however, in 2015, the Royal University of Bhutan, changed the position structure, and renamed as the President. The college's first Director was Dasho Sherab Tenzin (1992 to 1996, and in 1997 succeeded by Director, Mr. Jambay Dorji until 1999. By 2000, Mr. Dorji Wangchuk became the third director of the college until 2015. Wangchuk was promoted to director general in 2014. In 2016, Dr. Phub Dorji became the fourth director or the first President of the college. Mr. Sonam Wangchuk is the fifth head of the college since its establishment in 1992 and second President of the college under the Royal University of Bhutan.

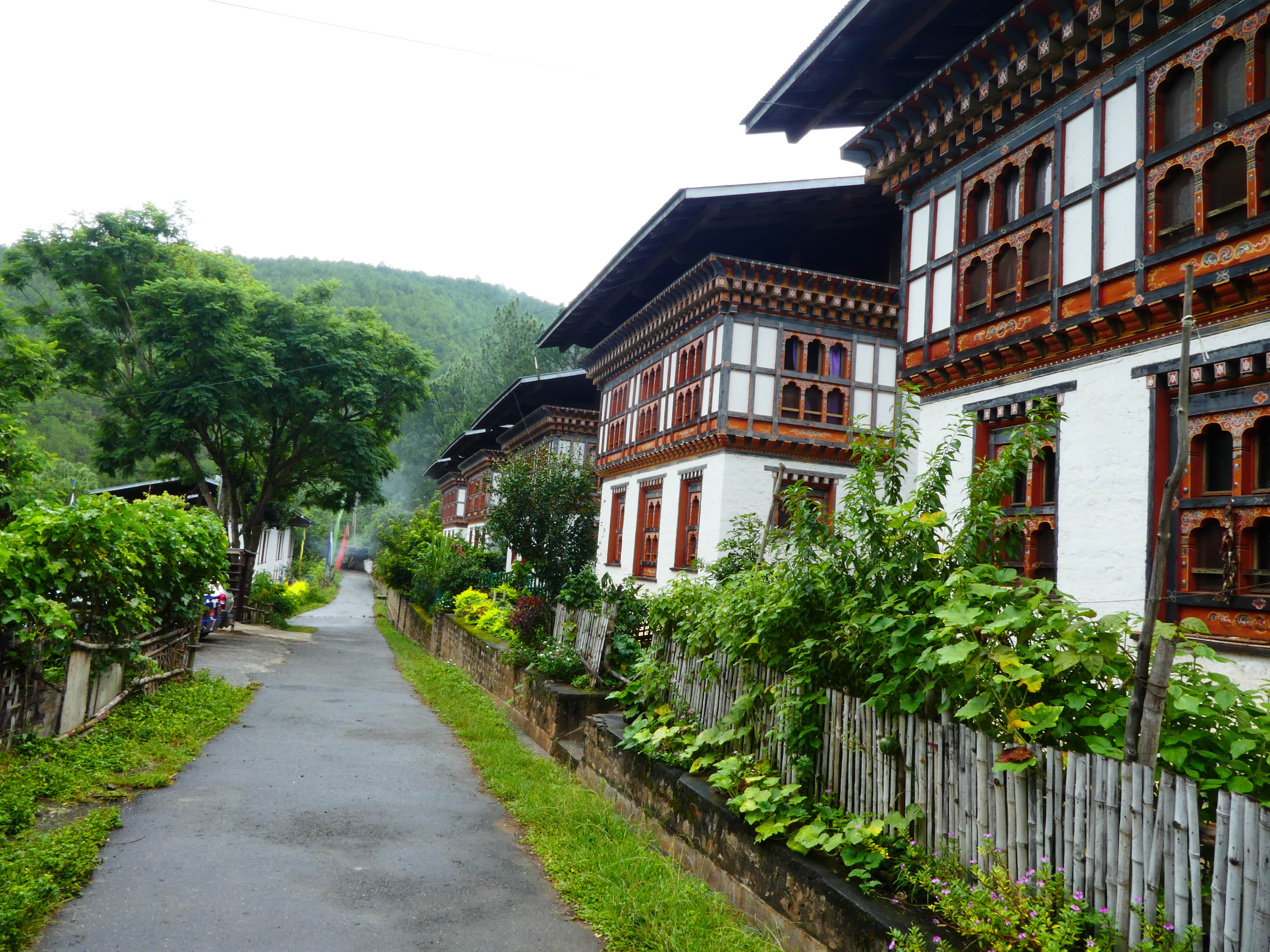
CNR Village, College of Natural Resources, Royal University of Bhutan

== Student life ==
The students are involved in several extracurricular activities apart from their academic curriculum.

- Choechog Club serves as an interest group for young people who would like to enhance spiritual and religious life. They participate in morning and evening prayers, rimdo and puja ceremonies etc.
- Y-Peer Club is associated to awareness on youth and women's issues and promote to enhance the awareness and education on sexual education, sexual harassment, substance abuse, etc.
- Other clubs include Media Club, Cultural Club, Literary Club, and GNH and well being clubs.

The three most popular sports at the college are soccer (football), badminton and basketball. The students also participate in other sports like table tennis and many other community services.

All of the students and most lecturers reside on the campus. Daily meals for students living on lower hostels are coordinated by the student themselves while students living on upper hostels do have self catering spaces. The residential area is well connected by a road to the academic buildings.
