= College of Agriculture and Natural Resources (Kwame Nkrumah University of Science and Technology) =

- Provost: Professor. Dadson Awunyo-Vitor
- Academic staff: 113
- Students: 4000
- Location: Kumasi, Sunyani Ghana
- Colours: Green and White
- Website: http://canr.knust.edu.gh/

The College of Agriculture and Renewable Natural Resources (CANR) is one of the six colleges of Kwame Nkrumah University of Science and Technology in Ghana.

CANR was founded in January 2005 after the release of revised university statuses in December 2004. It emerged from the former Faculty of Agriculture, the Institute of Renewable Natural Resources, and the School of Forestry.

CANR has a total of 13 academic departments with a student population of about 2000, an academic staff of about 90, and about 130 supporting staff.

== About the College ==
CANR was established in January 2005, after the release of the revised university statutes in December 2004. It was formed from the former Faculty of Agriculture, the Institute of Renewable Natural Resources, and the School of Forestry, Sunyani.

CANR is mandated to train and equip graduates with the requisite academic and entrepreneurial skills in the areas of agricultural production and natural resource management for sustainable national development, in addition to carrying out research and extension services in these areas.

The College with considerable support from the mainstream KNUST administration, has commenced the establishment of a fruit processing factory at Mantukwa near Sunyani in the Brong-Ahafo Region.

== Academics ==
CANR is involved in a number of collaborative research projects with national and international institutions and organizations, such as the Forestry Research Institute of Ghana (FORIG), Ministry of Food and Agriculture (MOFA), Forestry Commission, ICRA, and Canadian International Development Agency (CIDA), among others.

=== Faculties & Departments ===
Located at the west end of the University campus, CANR houses two Faculties:

==== Faculty of Agriculture ====
- Department of Agricultural Economics, Agribusiness and Extension
- Department of Animal Science
- Department of Crop and Soil Sciences
- Department of Horticulture

==== Faculty of Renewable Natural Resources ====
- Department of Agroforestry
- Department of Fisheries and Watershed Management
- Department of Silviculture and Forest Management
- Department of Wildlife and Range Management
- Department of Wood Science and Technology

=== Research Centres ===
In addition to the Faculties, CANR has four(4) Research Centres:

- Bureau of Integrated Rural Development (BIRD) now called Institute of Rural Development and Innovation Studies.
- Centre for Biodiversity Utilisation and Development (CBUD).
- Dairy/Beef cattle Research Station, Boadi.
- Agriculture Research Station, Anwomaso.

=== Programmes ===
CANRs offers undergraduate programmes leading to the award of a Bachelor of Science degree as well as postgraduate programmes leading to the award of MSc, MPhil or PhD degrees.

==== Undergraduate Programmes ====
BSc degrees are awarded by CANR's Faculties with specialisation options in the departments in those Faculties.

- BSc Agriculture
- BSc Natural Resources Management
- BSc Post Harvest Technology
- BSc Forest Resources Technology
- BSc Agriculture Biotechnology
- BSc Landscape Design and Management
- BSc Agribusiness and Management
- BSc Aquaculture and Water Resources Management
- BSc Meat and Dairy

==== Postgraduate Programmes ====
The college runs the following postgraduate programmes.

- MSc Agroforestry
- MSc Wood Technology and Management
- MPhil and PhD programmes are run in all Departments of the Faculty of Agriculture
