= Jigme Namgyel Engineering College =

- Motto: Technology Towards Better Tomorrow
- Type: Engineering College
- Established: 22 Feb 1972
- Affiliations: Royal University of Bhutan
- Chancellor: Jigme Khesar Namgyel Wangchuck
- Vice-Chancellor: Dasho Nidup Dorji
- Dean: Norden Wangchuck (Academic Affairs), Chenga Dorji (Student Affairs), TAshi Wangchuck (Research and Industrial Linkages)
- Director: Tshewang Lhendrup
- Location: Dewathang, Samdrup Jongkhar, Bhutan; 26°51′37.09″N 91°27′50.72″E
- Nickname: JNEC
- Website: http://www.jnec.edu.bt/

The Jigme Namgyel Engineering College (earlier known as Royal Bhutan Polytechnic, Royal Bhutan Institute of Technology and Jigme Namgyel Polytechnic) is a constituent colleges of the Royal University of Bhutan. It was established in 1972, coinciding with the third five-year economic development plan. It is 800 metres (2,600 ft) above sea level and is at the west end of Dewathang town. The institute is 18 kilometres (11 mi) from Samdrup Jongkhar in eastern Bhutan.

== History ==
It started with infrastructure development in 2018 and started offering diploma-level programmes in civil and electrical engineering from 22 February 1974. The course in mechanical engineering was introduced in 1988. In the early '70s, it offered certificate-level courses in surveying and draughting. (The courses in surveying and draughting were discontinued from the late '80s.)
