= Gaedu College of Business Studies =

Gedu College of Business Studies
- འབྲུག་རྒྱལ་འཛིན་གཙུག་ལག་སློབ་སྡེ། (Dzongkha)
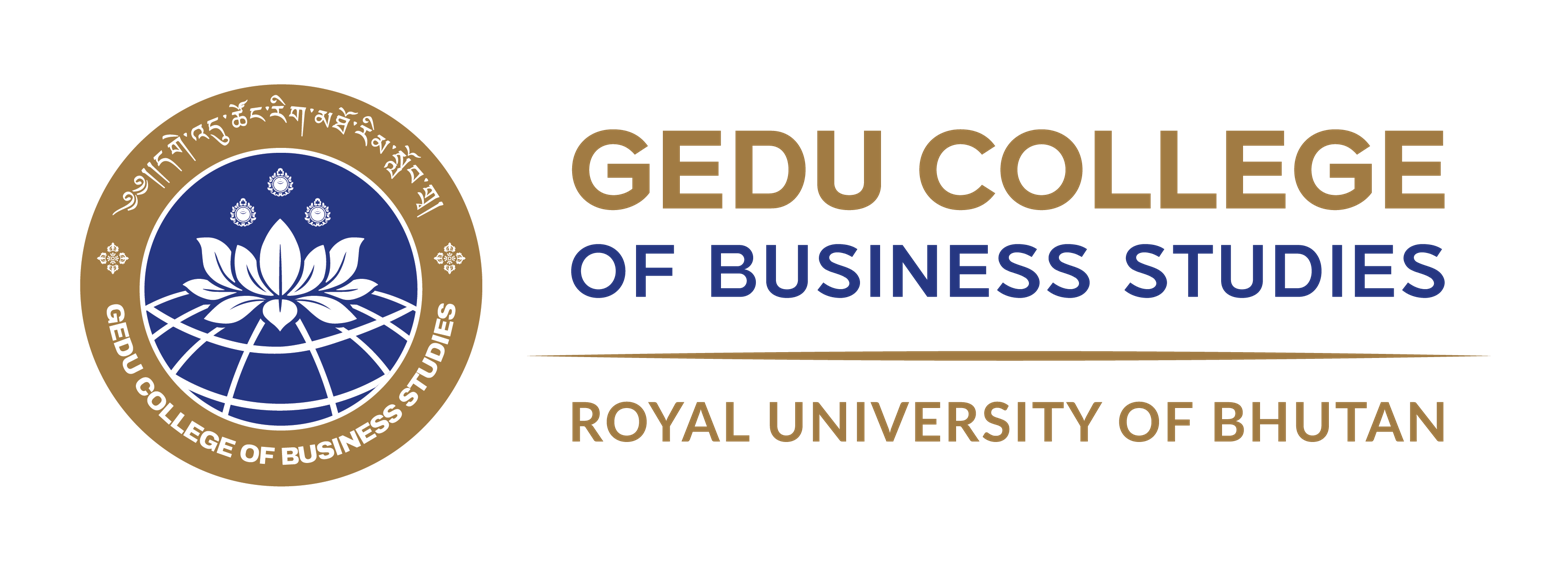
- Gedu College of Business Studies
- Type: Business & Management College
- Established: 2008
- Chancellor: Jigme Khesar Namgyel Wangchuck
- Vice-Chancellor: Chewang Rinzin
- President: Dalston Pung
- Academic staff: 60
- Total staff: 150
- Undergraduates: 1,250
- Location: Gedu, Chukha District, 21007, Bhutan; 26.922819°N 89.522039°E
- Campus: 184.16 acres (74.53 ha); Suburban
- Colours: Royal Blue Imperial Gold Golden Yellow
- Website: http://www.gcbs.edu.bt/

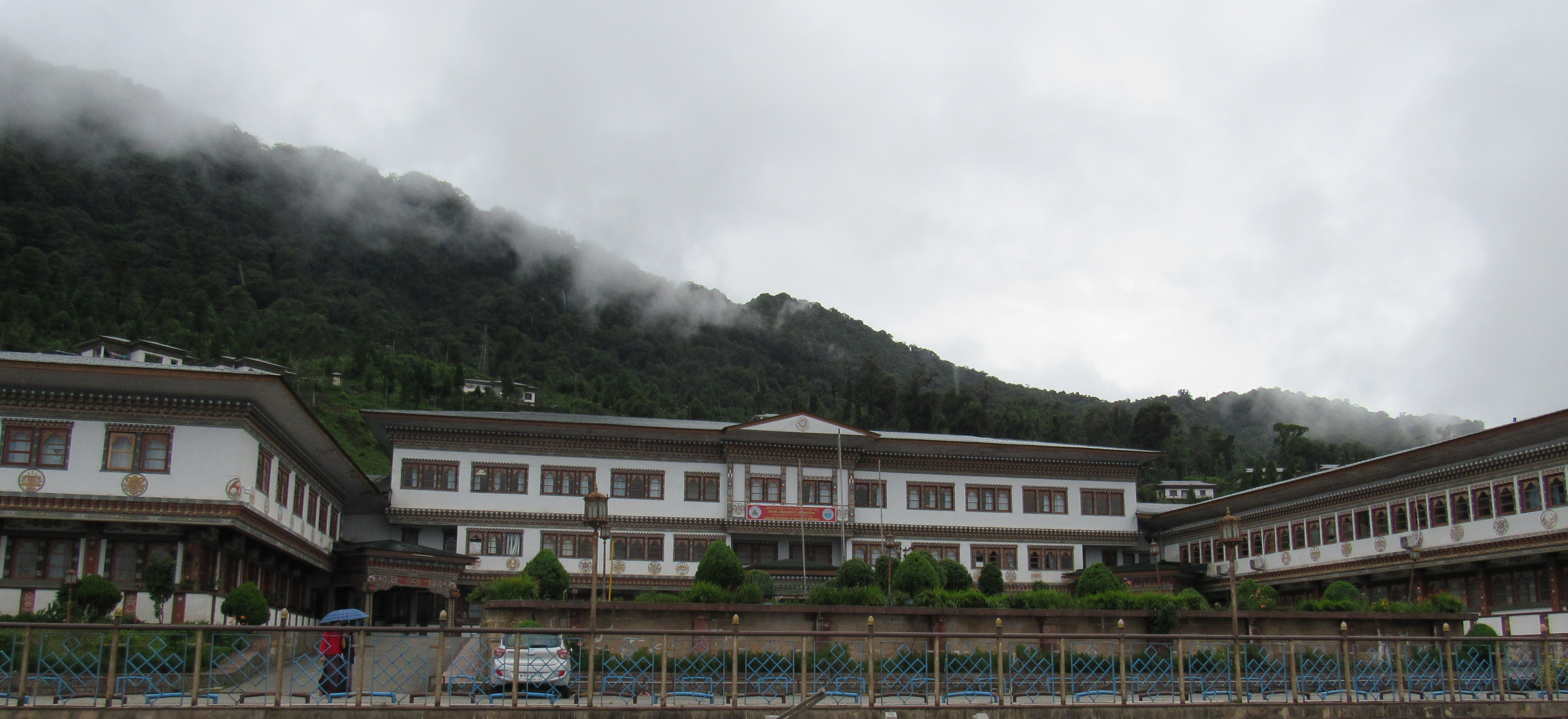
Buildings of Gaeddu College of Business Studies

Gedu College of Business Studies (GCBS) is a public autonomous constituent college under the Royal University of Bhutan. Located in Gedu, Chukha, it is the only college of the Royal University of Bhutan that specialises in business and management education. Established in 2008, the college offers a range of undergraduate and postgraduate programs in fields such as business administration, commerce, accounting, finance, marketing (Digital and Communication), human capital management, economics & business intelligence. Beginning in 2023, the college embarked on a significant strategic transformation to align its programs and vision with Bhutan's national development goals and international standards. Gedu College of Business Studies became a member of the Association to Advance Collegiate Schools of Business(AACSB) in 2019 and is currently actively pursuing accreditation.

== History ==
The college was founded in 2008 as a constituent member of the Royal University of Bhutan. Its establishment was part of a broader vision of His Majesty the Fourth King of Bhutan, Jigme Singye Wangchuck, to create an independent institution dedicated to business studies to serve Bhutan's growing economic needs in the face of globalisation.

The foundation of the college was built upon the transfer of the Department of Commerce from Sherubtse College, Bhutan's oldest college, to the new campus in Gedu. In 2012, GCBS expanded its academic offerings by launching its first postgraduate program, the Master of Business Administration (MBA). The college received an 'A' accreditation from the Bhutan Accreditation Council (BAC) in 2017, recognising its academic standards and quality. GCBS became a member of the Association to Advance Collegiate Schools of Business in 2019.

== Transformation (2023–2025) ==
Beginning in early 2023, GCBS initiated a comprehensive transformation to redefine its strategic direction as a key contributor to Bhutan's economic development. This transformation was a direct response to national mandates, including the Royal Kasho on Education Reform, Bhutan's Vision 2034, and the development of Gelephu Mindfulness City.

The college adopted a new guiding philosophy, including a redefined purpose, mission, and vision, developed through extensive consultations with stakeholders.

- New Vision: "To be Asia's leading business and management institution, driven by the values and principles of Gross National Happiness (GNH) for a prosperous and sustainable future."
- New Mission:
  - Develop internationally competent business and management professionals.
  - Deliver industry relevant, values driven business and management education.
  - Conduct impactful research leading to innovation and shaping policies and practices.
  - Drive a sustainable future through thought leadership and community initiatives.
  - Collaborate with strategic partners to enable meaningful changes.

A key goal of this transformation is to achieve international accreditation from bodies such as the Association to Advance Collegiate Schools of Business (AACSB) to benchmark its programs against global standards and rank among the top 250 business schools in Asia on QS World University Rankings & Times Higher Education. This period also saw a major academic diversification with the launch of six new undergraduate programs in July 2023 and a strategic rebranding to position GCBS as a forward-thinking institution.

== Governance and Organisation ==
As a constituent college of the Royal University of Bhutan system, GCBS operates with academic and administrative autonomy. The college is led by a President, who serves as the chief executive officer. The current President, Mr Dalston Pung, oversees the overall administration, educational direction, and strategic planning of the institution.

== Campus ==
The Gedu College of Business Studies campus is situated in the town of Gedu, within the Chukha District of southwestern Bhutan. The campus spans 184.16 acres and is equipped with a range of facilities to support academic and student life.

Since 2023, the college has invested significantly in modernising its infrastructure, including the construction of new girls' hostels and the renovation of classrooms with interactive smart boards.

- Academic Facilities: Modern lecture halls and classrooms, specialised IT Digital laboratories, and a central library with access to digital databases like Web of Science.
- Residential Facilities: On-campus hostels for students and dedicated guest accommodations.
- Recreational Facilities: An indoor sports complex and a gymnasium.
- Amenities: Cafeterias, convenience shops, a prayer hall, a Bhutan Postal Corporation office branch, and a branch of the Bank of Bhutan.

== Academics ==
The academic structure of GCBS is organised into four schools, each focusing on specific areas of business and management. As part of its transformation, the college launched six new specialised undergraduate programs in 2023.

Undergraduate Programmes (2008-2023)

- Bachelor of Business Administration (B.BA)
- Bachelor of Commerce (B.Com)

Undergraduate Programmes (2023 Onwards)

- Bachelor of Human Capital Management
- Bachelor of Marketing (Digital and Communication)
- Bachelor of Accountancy
- Bachelor of Finance and Economics
- Bachelor of Business Intelligence

Postgraduate Programs (2026 Onwards)

- Master of Business Administration (MBA) in Transformative Leadership

== Centres ==
GCBS launched dedicated centres with senior faculty leading the centres to focus on developing excellence in academic student development initiatives.

- Centre for Academic Transformation
- Centre for Faculty Development
- Centre for Student Development
- Centre for Business and Management Research
- Centre for Entrepreneurship and Executive Training

== Admissions ==
Admission to the undergraduate programs at GCBS is competitive and managed through an online portal. The selection process is based on a merit system that combines a candidate's academic performance in their Class XII examinations with their score on the GCBS Entrance Test (GET).

== Student Life ==
The college has an annual intake of approximately 350-400 students. The institution emphasises a holistic education experience, encouraging student participation in a variety of co-curricular activities.

To centralise student support, the college established the Centre for Student Development, which provides academic advising, career counselling, and health resources. GCBS also maintains an active alumni network that engages with current students through mentorship programs and professional development opportunities.
