= Royal Institute of Health Sciences (Bhutan) =

National medical education center

Coordinates: 27°27′53″N 89°38′14″E

The Royal Institute of Health Sciences (RIHS) is one of two main medical education centers in Bhutan, the other being the Institute of Traditional Medicine Services. It was established in Thimphu in 1974, as a member college of the Royal University of Bhutan, and is associated with the National Referral Hospital. It offers diploma and certificate programmes for nurses, medical technicians and other primary health care workers. The institute received the World Health Organization's 50th Anniversary Award for Primary Health Care in 1998.

Health infrastructure is improving in Bhutan and the number of trained human resource officers is growing, but the country still had only two doctors for ten thousand people in 2005. The RIHS cannot train doctors, so Bhutan must send candidates to neighboring countries such as Bangladesh, India, Myanmar and Sri Lanka for their MBBS course.

== Courses ==
=== Nursing ===
The institute trains auxiliary nurse midwives, general nurse midwives and assistant nurses. A joint initiative between La Trobe University, the World Health Organization and the Royal Government of Bhutan gives Bhutanese qualified nurses the opportunity to obtain a bachelor's degree. Students who successfully complete this program are eligible to apply for postgraduate studies in Australia.

=== Pharmacy ===
The RIHS conducts a two-year Pharmacy Technician Course, teaching students pharmacy and pharmacology, with basic introductions to physiology, anatomy, health education, first aid etc. Other health work trainees are also taught pharmacology and pharmacy on similar lines.

=== Physiotherapy ===
The RIHS offers a two-years certificate program in Physiotherapy, following which the students work for a few more months in the general referral hospital, before servicing various districts across the country.

=== Health Assistants and Technicians ===
The institute also trains health assistants, basic health workers and technicians of various other disciplines such as laboratory, dental, medical radiography, ophthalmology and operating theater.
