= Royal University of Bhutan =

National university system of Bhutan

- འབྲུག་རྒྱལ་འཛིན་གཙུག་ལག་སློབ་སྡེ་
- Type: Public
- Established: 2003; 23 years ago
- Chancellor: King of Bhutan
- Vice-Chancellor: Chewang Rinzin
- Location: Thimphu, Bhutan
- Nickname: RUB
- Website: http://www.rub.edu.bt/

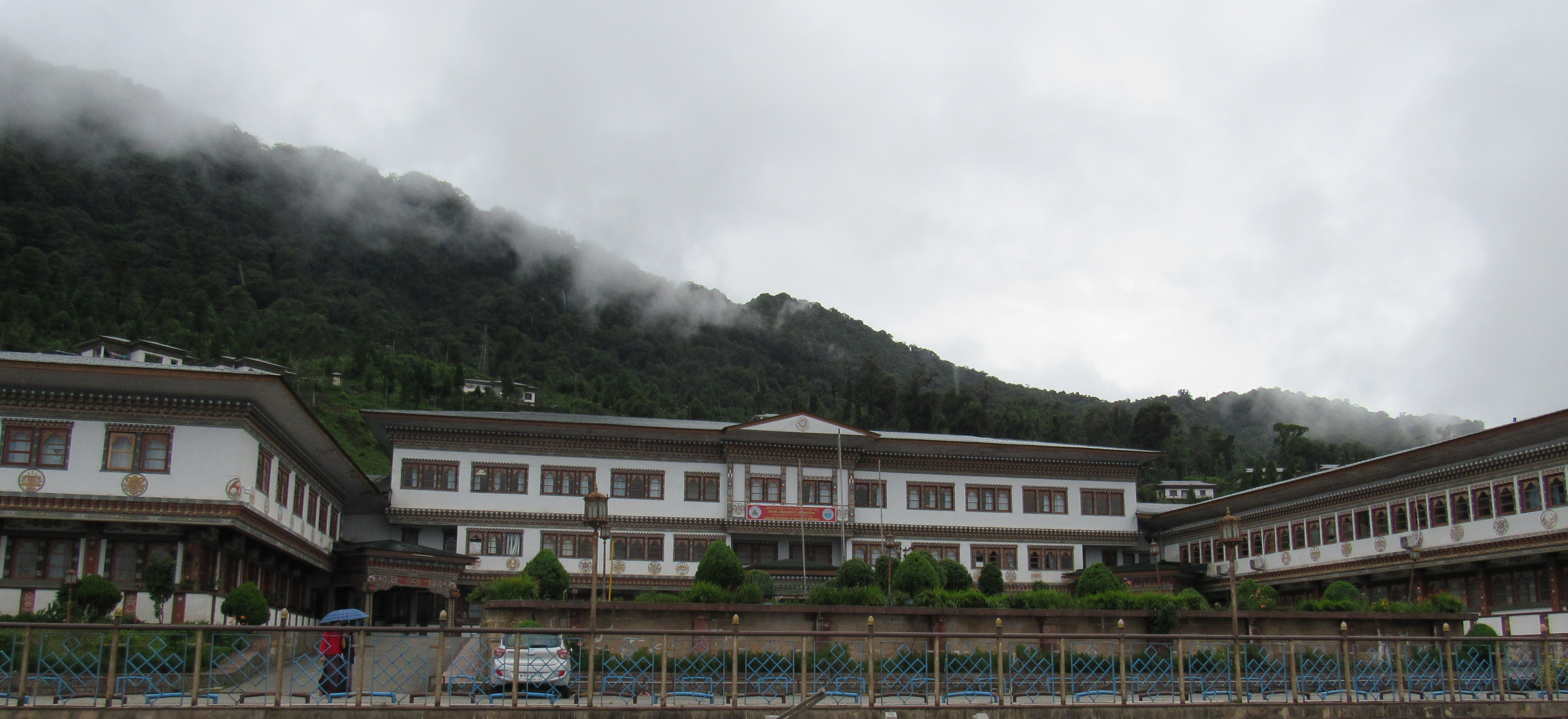
Gaedu College of Business Studies, an autonomous government college under the Royal University of Bhutan

The Royal University of Bhutan (Dzongkha: འབྲུག་རྒྱལ་འཛིན་གཙུག་ལག་སློབ་སྡེ་; Wylie: 'brug rgyal-'dzin gtsug-lag-slob-sde), founded on June 2, 2003, by a royal decree, is the national university of Bhutan. It is the first and the oldest university in Bhutan.

== Colleges ==
The university was established to consolidate the management of tertiary education in Bhutan. It is a decentralized university with nine constituent colleges and two affiliated college spread across the kingdom. The principle which influenced the development of a university system was the government's priority for equitable development. The colleges of the university are:

- College of Natural Resources (CNR) in Lobesa, Punakha
- College of Science and Technology (CST) in Rinchhending, Phuntsholing
- Gaeddu College of Business Studies (GCBS) in Gedu, Chukha
- College of Language and Culture Studies (CLCS) in Taktse, Trongsa.
- Jigme Namgyel Engineering College (JNEC) in Dewathang, Samdrup Jongkhar
- Paro College of Education (PCE) in Paro
- Royal Thimphu College (RTC) in Ngabiphu, Thimphu (affiliated college)
- Norbuling Righter College, paro (affiliated college)
- Samtse College of Education (SCE) in Samtse
- Sherubtse College in Kanglung, Trashigang
- Gyalpozhing College of Information Technology in Chamjekha, Thimphu

The university maintains a connection with other universities which include the University of New Brunswick in Canada, Naropa University and the School for International Training in the United States, the University of Salzburg in Austria, and the University of Delhi in India, in the areas of research, student exchange and internship programs for students and faculty.

Jigme Khesar Namgyel Wangchuck, the fifth king of Bhutan, is the chancellor. His Majesty The King appointed Chewang Rinzin as the Vice Chancellor of the Royal University of Bhutan on 20 December 2024.

The Centre for Bhutan Studies (CBS) in Thimphu, originally slated to become a member institution of the university, has retained its autonomous status.

== Administration ==
Based on the distributed model with campuses of the colleges forming the core element of the university, the office of the vice-chancellor at the center is responsible for central coordination while the constituent member colleges look after academic functions of teaching and research within their respective colleges. Located at Mothithang, Thimphu, the office of the vice-chancellor consists of the departments of registry, academic affairs, planning and resources, and research and external relations.

The twofold objective of the university as stated in the royal charter (RUB 2003, p. 3) is to develop and provide programmes of study at tertiary education level, of relevance and good quality which will fulfill the needs of the country for an educated and skilled population; and to promote and conduct research, to contribute to the creation of knowledge in an international context and to promote the transfer of knowledge of relevance to Bhutan.

== Programmes ==
The Royal University of Bhutan offers programmes across its campuses in eight broad curriculum areas. These include:

- teacher education
- business and management
- engineering and physical sciences
- computing and information science
- biological sciences and agriculture
- health sciences
- humanities and social sciences
- Dzongkha language and literature

There are plans to include programmes in arts and design, media and mass communication, Bhutanese history and culture, gross national happiness, counseling and Buddhist studies in the colleges.

Most programmes are full-time, although the two colleges of education, Sherubtse College, and the Institute of Language and Culture Studies, offer part-time and distance education programmes. Some programmes offered at Sherubtse College provide their students with freedom to cross departmental boundaries with double degree programmes.

The university offers diploma, degree, and honours degree courses of study.

=== Diploma ===
The diploma programme consists of 240 credits out of which at least 100 credits are at second year degree level. The programme usually takes over two years of full-time study, or more, if it consists of more than 120 credits.

The diploma may be an interim award in a degree programme, in which case the programme aims to prepare diploma graduates for employment as well as to prepare them to progress to the award of a degree. The diploma may also be an award for an entirely free standing programme unrelated to a degree programme, in which case the programme aims at every specific employment or skills-based target.

=== Degree ===
The degree programme consists of 360 credits, out of which at least 90 shall be at third year level. The degree programme usually takes over three years of full-time study, or more, if it consists of more than 360 credits.

=== Honours degree ===
The honours degree supplements and develops the subject matter learned from the degree to a higher level. It includes a project, emphasizes students' self study and prepares them for postgraduate study. The honours degree consists of 480 credits, out of which at least 90 credits are at fourth year level. The honours degree usually takes over four years of full-time study, with the inclusion of the degree programme of 360 credits included.

Students across the colleges have opportunities to partake in activities from study of their programmes and community service to a range of extracurricular activities.
