= Civil aviation in Bhutan =

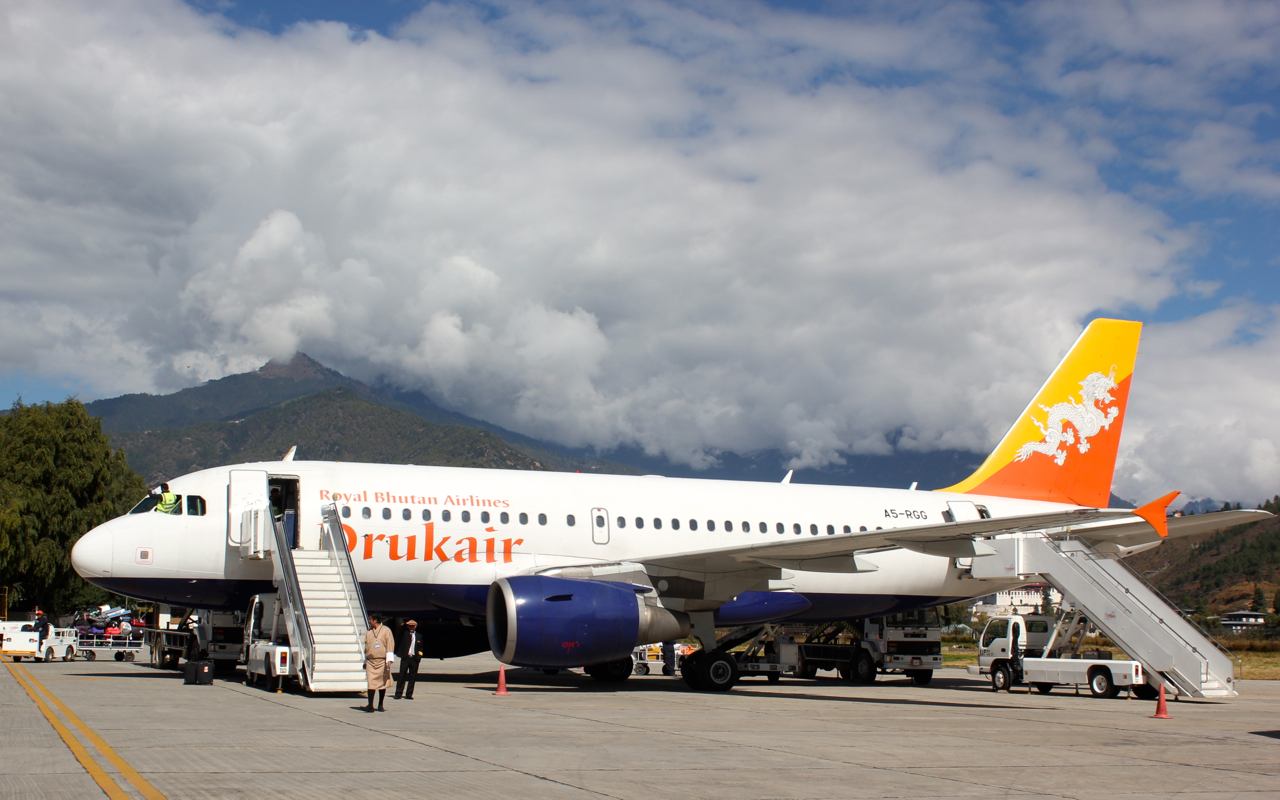
Drukair, Bhutan's flag carrier.

Civil Aviation in Bhutan is one of the smallest aviation industries which is overlooked by the Department of Civil Aviation.

== History ==
Bhutan's aviation story starts with Jamair, who on 15 December 1968, announced flights from Calcutta to Paro Airstrip, which was the first time Bhutan was connected to the outside world through flight.

Drukair, the nations flag carrier, was founded in 1981, and commenced operations in 1983.

== Airports ==
Bhutan only has 4 civil airports, likely due to the mountainous terrain of the country,making it hard to find a location to build.

These are:

- Gelephu Airport
- Bathpalathang Airport
- Paro International Airport
- Yangphulla Airport
