= Rail transport in Bhutan =

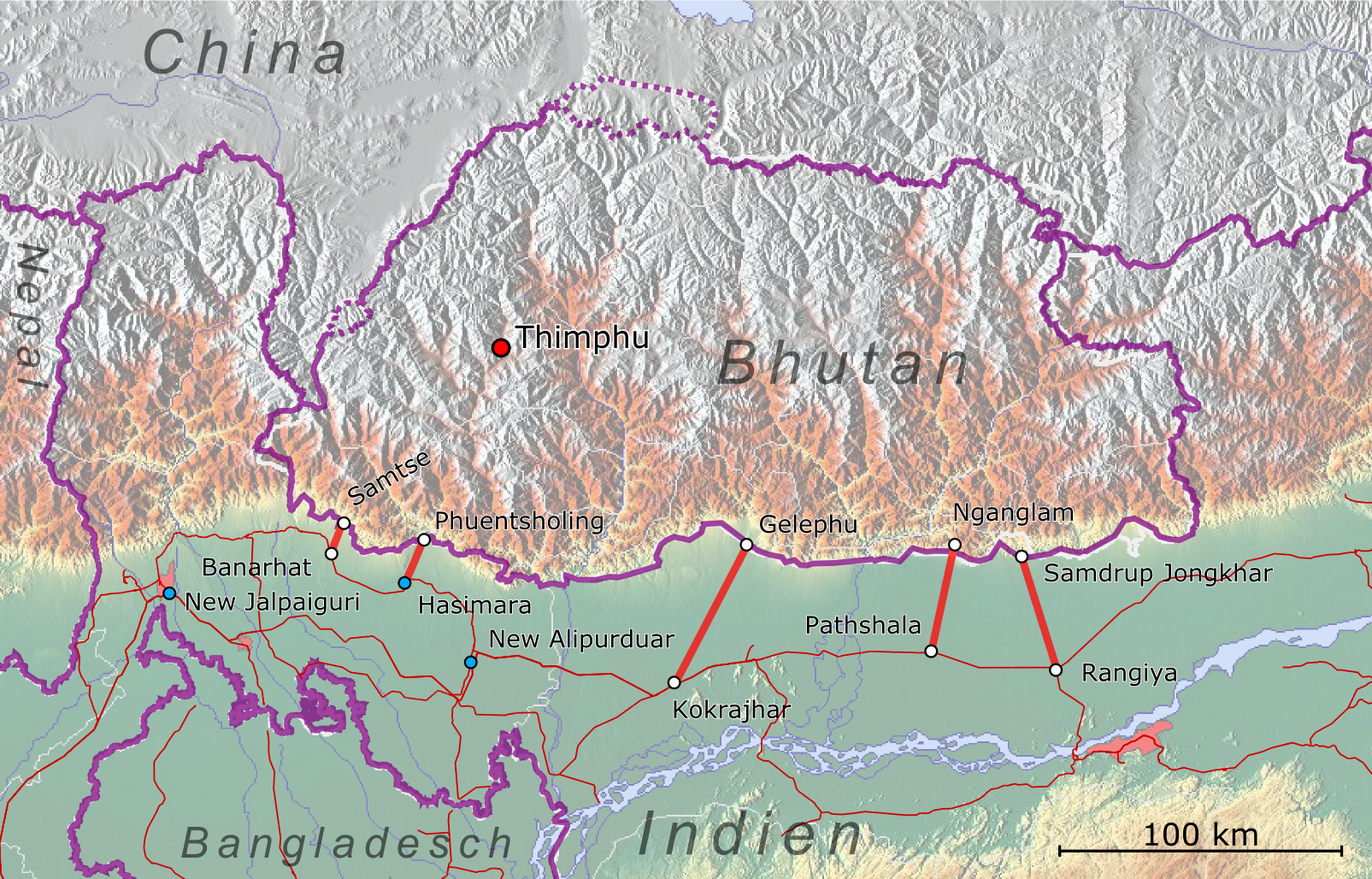
German language map of proposed rail lines to Bhutan

There is not currently, and never has been, any rail transport in Bhutan, but several rail lines have been planned to connect Bhutan to India's rail network both historically in 2005 and in more recent years.

== Planned ==
Bhutan and India signed a memorandum of understanding in January 2005 to connect Bhutan with the Indian Railways network with 5 new routes in Bhutan. Additionally, the Indian Military has also identified more routes to complement the India-China Border Roads (ICBR) and negate the Siliguri Corridor's geostrategic vulnerability, all of which will be 1,676 mm (5 ft 6 in) broad gauge. In 2025, Indian authorities approved plans to build two rail lines which will include sections within Bhutan. In total, there will be 4.5 km of rail line in Bhutan if this plan is completed, with the track planned to be constructed by Indian railways to a 1675mm gauge.

Note: Rail lines listed west to east.

Route	Length (km)	Future Extensions	Operational (date)	Major tunnels # & names	Major bridges # & names	Conceived by	Status/Comments
Gangtok-Nathang-Haa-Paro-Thimphu line		Ext-1: Yongphulla Airport-Bathpalathang Airport-Lingmethang(Mongar)-Thimphu-Paro International Airport line. Also see Ext-3 for Paro-Doklam-Lingzhi Yügyal Dzong connection.	N (2027?)			Indian Military	Gangtok-Nathang-Haa-Paro International Airport-Thimphu.
Banarhat–Samtse line	18 km	Ext-2: Samtse-Nathu La line	N (2025?)			2005 Indo-Bhutan MoU	Banarhat–Samtse.
Hasimara–Pasakha-Phuentsholing line	18 km	Ext-3: Phuentsholing-Paro International Airport-Doklam-Lingzhi Yügyal Dzong line.	N (2025?)			2005 Indo-Bhutan MoU	Hasimara Airforce Station–Pasakha-Phuentsholing. This line has the first priority to be constructed due to high passenger and goods transportation.
Kokrajhar–Gelephu line (Gelephu Airport)	70 km		N (2025?)			2005 Indo-Bhutan MoU	Kokrajhar of New Jalpaiguri–New Bongaigaon section–Gelephu. survey completed in April 2023 and construction will be completed by 2026 (aug 2023 update).
Pathsala–Naglam line	40 km	Ext-4: Naglam-Lingmethang(Mongar)-Lhuntse-Rinchen Bumpa line with spur to Trashiyangtse in northeast. Also see Ext-1 for connection in east to Yongphulla Airport (& Lumla-Tawang).	N (2025?)			2005 Indo-Bhutan MoU	Pathsala–Naglam.
Rangla–Darranga–Samdrup Jongkhar line	60 km		N (2025?)			2005 Indo-Bhutan MoU	Rangla–Darranga–Samdrup Jongkhar.
Tawang-Trashigang-Yongphulla line		See Ext-1 (Thimphu-Tawang).	N (2027?)			Indian Military	Tawang-Lumla-Trashigang-Yongphulla Airport.

== See also ==
- Bhutan
  - Transport in Bhutan
- Neighbourhood connectivity
  - China–India railway
  - Geostrategic railways under-construction in India
  - India-China Border roads and rails
  - North Eastern Railway Connectivity Project
  - Rail transport in Sikkim
