= List of airlines of Bhutan =

This is a list of airlines currently operating in Bhutan.

== Scheduled airlines ==
Airline	Image	IATA	ICAO	Callsign	Commenced operations	Fleet Size	Notes
Bhutan Airlines		B3	BTN	BHUTAN AIR	2011	2	
Drukair		KB	DRK	ROYAL BHUTAN	1981	5	

== See also ==
- List of airlines
- List of defunct airlines of Asia
