= List of airlines of Palau =

This is a list of airlines currently operating in Palau.

Airline	Image	IATA	ICAO	Callsign	Commenced operations	Notes
Belau Air				BELAU	1989	
Alii Palau Airlines		RO	ROR		2022	

== See also ==
- List of airlines
- List of defunct airlines of Oceania
