= Yonphula Lhakhang =

Buddhist monastery in Bhutan

Religion
- Affiliation: Tibetan Buddhism

Location
- Location: Bhutan
- Country: Bhutan

Yonphula Lhakhang is a Buddhist monastery in Bhutan. It is situated in the Eastern District of Bhutan. The Lhakhang or monastery in Yonphula was founded by Tantric Master Lama Karpo Rinpoche alias Lama Tshewang Penjor. He was the disciple of Tertoen Dudjom Lingpa Jigdrel Yeshi Dorji, who named him as Lama Karpo. Before he actually met with his karmic Master, Lama Karpo went to Tibet to learn and master the Tantric practices. There in Kongbu, Tibet, he has mastered and directed him by his master therefrom to visit his Karmic Master Dudjom Rinpoche. Lama Karpo Meditated in Paro Taktshang. While meditating in the cave, where Guru Rinpoche had meditated, he heard a clear voice from the Guru's statue. He was said to have astonished by this and felt himself to be experiencing an illusion; on another occasion, he had a conversation with the statue. In later years, he returned to Trashigang and founded Yonphula Monastery. It is approximately 2700 meters above the sea level. It is few km away from the Yongphulla Airport Currently, the abode is headed by Lama Jigme Tenzin, son of Lama Karpo. There are approximately 100 gomchens. They perform periodical rituals and other related religious rituals. There is a Meditation Center where many Gomchens meditate for minimum of three years. After that, they are known to be tshampas or Yogi. They follow the Nyingma Tersar religion. It performs its Tshechu in the tenth day of the third month of the Lunar calendar annually. It is called Trelda Tshechu.
