= Bathpalathang Airport =

Domestic airport in Bhutan

- IATA: BUT; ICAO: VQBT

Summary
- Airport type: Public
- Operator: Department of Civil Aviation
- Serves: Jakar, Bhutan
- Elevation AMSL: 2,700 m (8,900 ft)
- Coordinates: 27°33′46″N 090°44′47″E

Map
- Location of the airport in Bhutan

Runways
| Direction | Length | | Surface |
| Direction | m | ft | Surface |
|---|---|---|---|
| 14/32 | 1,200 | 3,937 | Asphalt |
- Source: DAFIF

Bathpalathang Airport (IATA: BUT, ICAO: VQBT) is a domestic Bhutanese airport in Jakar (Bjakar), Bumthang District. One of only four airports in the country, it opened on 17 December 2011 with flights to Paro. The airport suspended operations in July 2012 due to runway damage, but it has since reopened to limited service.

== Overview ==
The airport was in development from the Royal Bhutanese Government's 10th Five Year Plan (2008). The airport was originally scheduled to open in October 2010, and then delayed to November 2010. By December 2010, operations were pushed back to March 2011, then April 2011. Shortages in the spring prompted a new target date of July 2011, however the airport had not yet opened for operations through late 2011.

Airport construction at Bathpalathang met several delays, including soil instability under the runway, funding, labor and material shortages, and nearby river protection and diversion, each of which undermined the ultimate success of any airport at the site. Despite assurances by government personnel and contractors that the airport would be completed on time, it was completed significantly behind schedule. Further complications arose from legislated land and property compensation schemes for those who were forced to relocate to accommodate the airport.

Both Druk Air and Tashi Air conducted inaugural flights to Bathpalathang on 17 December 2011, coinciding with the national day of Bhutan. However, Druk Air's inaugural flight failed to make a profit.

A redevelopment project is underway as of April 2015, with a cost of over Nu 15 million. The first phase, the construction of an apron capable of handling 2 ATR aircraft, is nearing completion. The second phase involves the construction of a terminal building. Once the terminal has been built, the new apron will begin to be used.

== Airlines and destinations ==
| Airlines | Destinations |
|---|---|
| Drukair | Paro |

== See also ==
- Transport in Bhutan
- List of airports in Bhutan
