= Pasakha =

- Town
- Location in Bhutan
- Coordinates: 26.8439°N 89.4524°E
- Country: Bhutan
- Dzongkhag: Chukha District
- Time zone: UTC+6 (BTT)

Pasakha is a town in southern Bhutan. It has been described as the only industrial town in Bhutan, as it is home to several heavy industries. Tashi Group, the largest private company in Bhutan, operates a chemical plant, a ferrosilicon plant and a soft drinks bottling factory. In total there are 26 factories located in Pasakha. As a side effect of these industries, the town is one of the few places in Bhutan where air pollution is a concern. Local villagers also have a shortage of water due to the high water demand of the nearby industries.

The location is favourable for industry due to the proximity of raw materials, and for exports, the Indian border is nearby.

In 1996 and in August 2000, the town suffered from flood damage from the Basra river.

== See also ==
- Transport in Bhutan
- Economy of Bhutan
