= Transport in Bhutan =

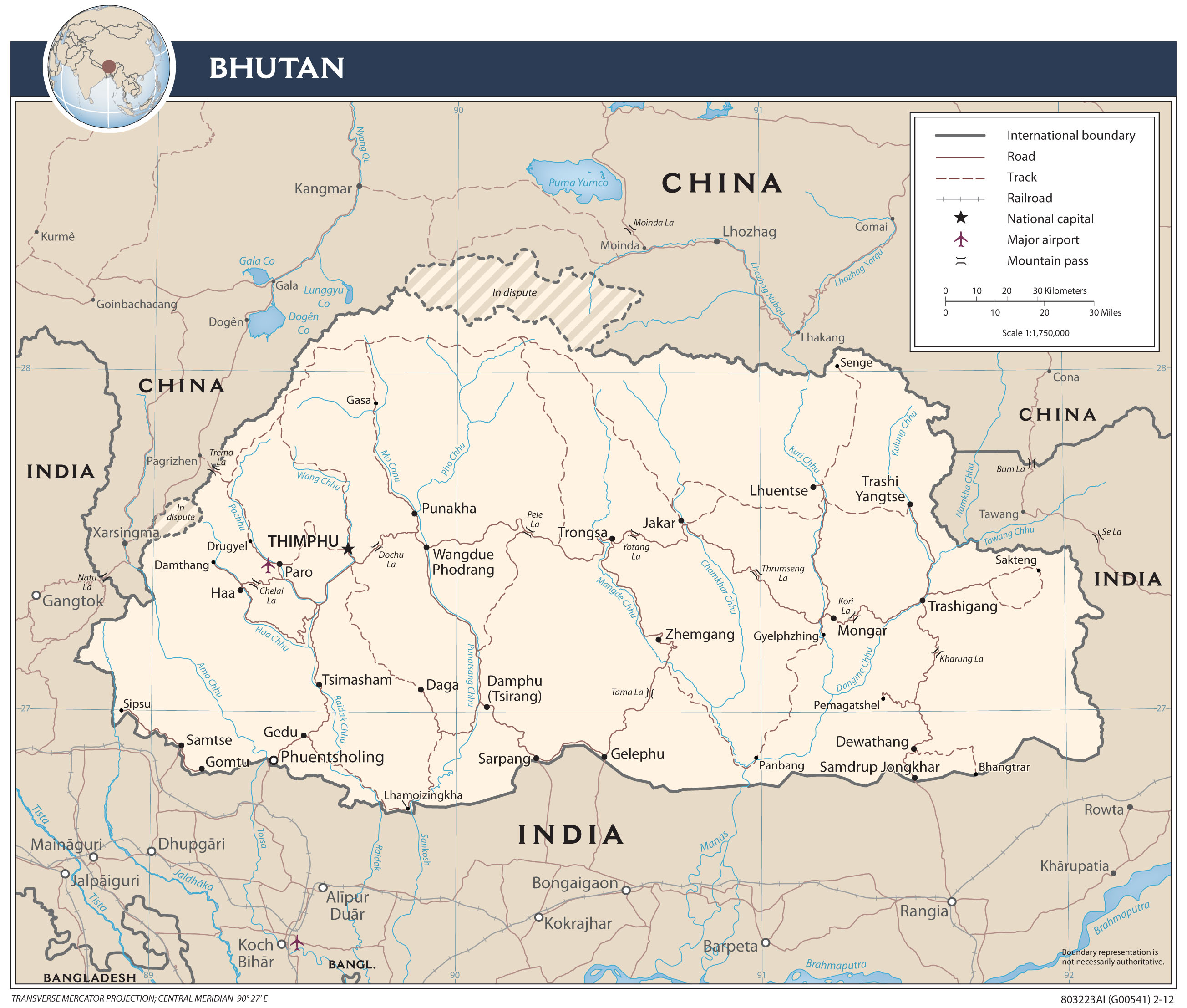
Map of transport system in Bhutan, 2012

Transport in Bhutan uses about 8,000 kilometres (5,000 mi) of roads and four airports, three of which are operational and interconnected. Paro Airport is the only airport which accommodates international flights. As part of Bhutan's infrastructure modernization programs, its road system has been under development since the 1960s. There are no railways (although one is planned), and as Bhutan is a landlocked country with no major waterways, there are no ports.

== Road ==
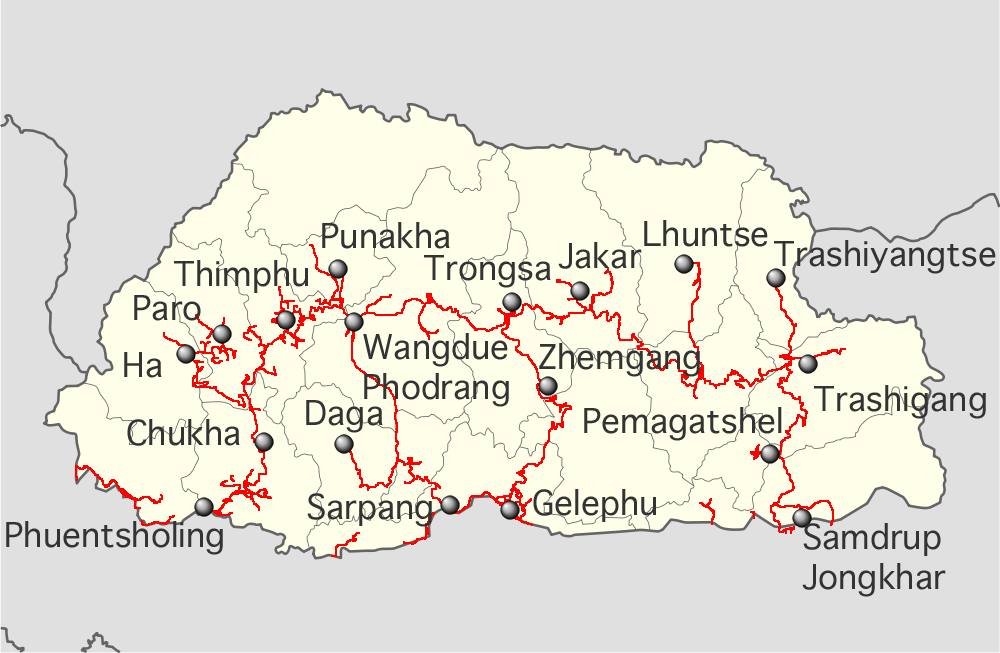
Highways of Bhutan

Bhutan had a total of 8,050 km (5,000 mi) of roads in 2003, 4,991 km (3,101 mi) of which were paved and 3,059 km (1,901 mi) unpaved. Because of the lack of paved roads, travel in Bhutan was by foot or on mule- or horseback until 1961; the 205-kilometre (127 mi) trip from the Indian border to Thimphu took six days. Road construction began in earnest during the First Development Plan (1961–66). The first 175-kilometre-long (109 mi) paved road was completed in 1962. A branch road later linked Paro with the Phuntsholing–Thimphu road, and a jeep track linked Thimphu and Phuntsholing with Jaigaon, West Bengal. Travel time by motor vehicle from the border to Thimphu shrank to six hours. About 30,000 Indian and Nepalese labourers were imported to build the road with Indian aid when India was bolstering its defence against a potential Chinese invasion. Bhutan also provided labour for the construction work. Another road was built to connect Trashigang with Tawang, Arunachal Pradesh.

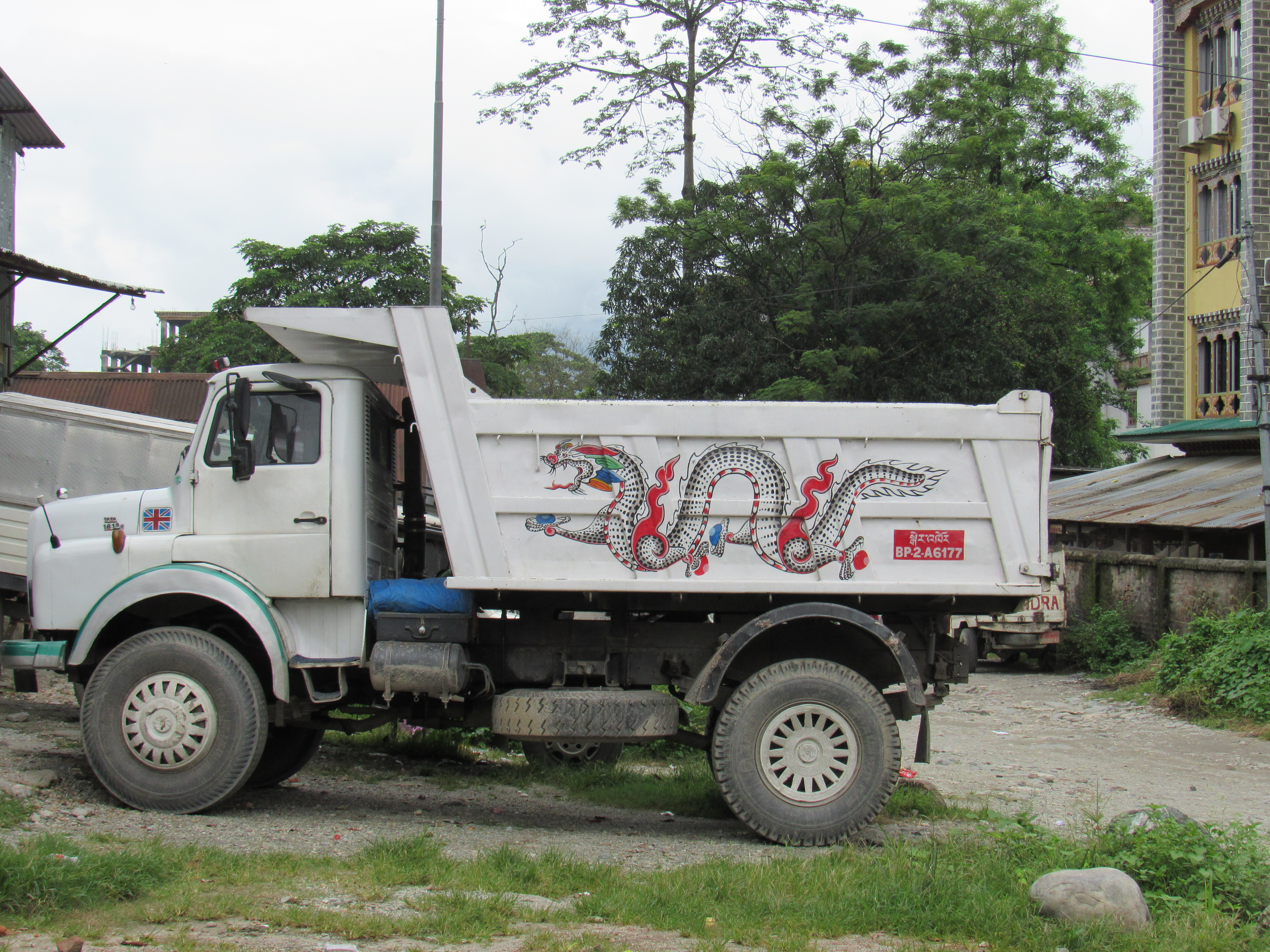
Dump truck in Bhutan

About 1,500 kilometres (930 mi) of roads were built by the mid-1970s, largely with manual labour. There was a 2,280-kilometre (1,420 mi) road network in 1989; at least 1,761 kilometres (1,094 mi) were paved with asphalt, and 1,393 kilometres (866 mi) were classified as national highways. Despite the construction of paved roads linking the principal towns in the south, mountainous terrain elsewhere makes travel difficult even from one valley to the next. Most roads run in river valleys. As part of the Sixth Development Plan (1987–92), the Department of Public Works (in cooperation with the Indian Border Roads Organization) made plans to construct and upgrade 1,000 kilometres (620 mi) of roads and to extend the road network through Bhutan's five major river valleys by 1992. Driveable roads were not the only important development; as part of the Fifth Development Plan, Bhutan also needed an estimated 2,500 kilometres (1,600 mi) of mule tracks to connect the country's 4,500 settlements.

The country's primary road is the East-West Highway (known locally as the Lateral Road), which began construction in 1962. The road begins in Phuentsholing on the southwestern Indian border and ends in Trashigang in the far east, with spurs to other major centres such as Paro, Thimphu, and Punakha. The 2.5-metre-wide (8.2 ft) Lateral Road must support traffic in both directions, since the cost of cutting a wider road through the middle Himalayas would be prohibitive. Safety barriers, road markings, and signage are sparse. Traffic is slow, typically about 15 km/h (9.3 mph), to minimise head-on collisions. Road accidents are still frequent and, because of the steep topography, typically horrific. Most of the route between Paro Airport and Thimphu has been improved as a two-lane road.

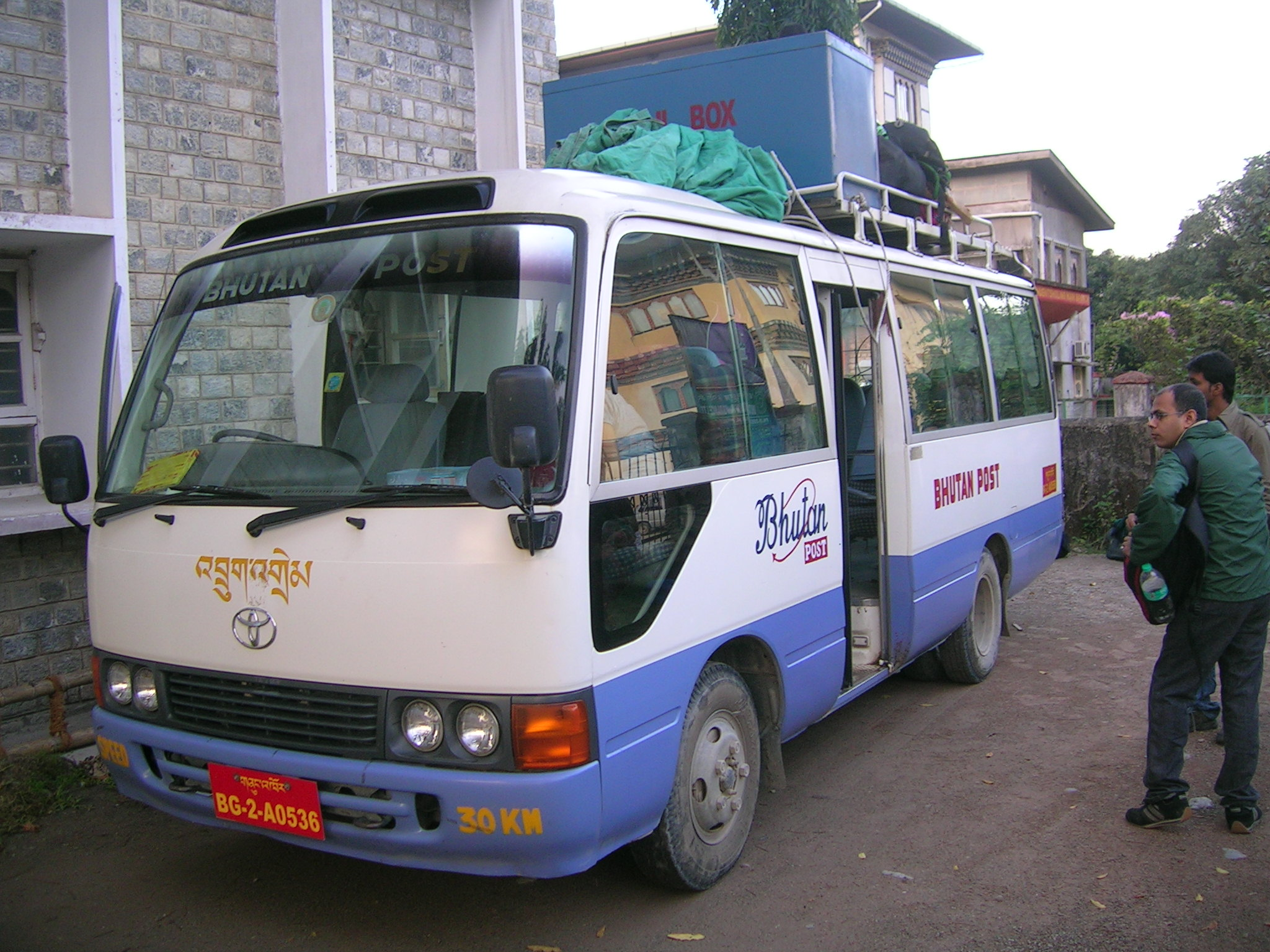
Postbus running between Thimphu and Phuntsholing

The Lateral Road traverses a number of high passes, including Tremo La and Do Chu La. The highest pass on the road is at Chapcha; the second-highest pass is at Trumshing La, in central Bhutan, at an altitude of over 3,800 m (12,500 ft).

Main roads in western and eastern Bhutan are maintained by Dantak, a task force of India's Border Roads Organisation. Roads in the rest of the country are maintained by the Bhutanese government's Department of Roads.

Much of the country's geology is unstable and there are frequent slips and landslides, aggravated by the summer monsoon and winter snowstorms and frost heaving. Teams of Indian labourers are housed at work camps in the mountain passes to clear blocked roads. Conditions in the camps are poor, with workers breaking rocks into gravel on a piece-rate basis when not clearing the roads. An international aid project is underway to stabilise the worst sections of the road. A major Japanese aid project aims to replace most of the narrow, single-track bridges with two-way girder spans capable of carrying heavier traffic.

Most freight is moved on eight-ton 300 hp (224 kW) Tata trucks, which are often overloaded. There is a network of passenger buses, and the most common vehicle in government and private use is the four-wheel-drive pickup truck.

A national driver-licensing system includes a driving test. Government drivers are trained at the Samthang Vocational Training Institute's driving school (formerly the National Driving Training Institute). The roads have traffic lights; although a stoplight in Thimphu was dismantled, there are reportedly plans to reinstall it.

== Rail ==
Bhutan has no railways. On 25 January 2005 the king of Bhutan and the prime minister of India signed an agreement to establish the following the link and initiated the feasibility study. These rail links are listed from west to east and subcategorised by connection to respective states of India:

- West Bengal state of India:
  - Banarhat–Samtse line, ? km: from Banarhat in India to border town Samtse in Bhutan.
  - "Hasimara–Phuentsholing-Pasakha line" (Hasimara–Toribari-Pasakha line), ? km long: from Hasimara to (Toribari)Phuentsholing and then further 18 km to Pasakha. In December 2009 the king of Bhutan approved the final plan to build an 11-mile-long (18 km), 5 ft 6 in (1,676 mm) broad gauge rail link between Hashimara in West Bengal and Toribari in Bhutan. The railway, via Satali, Bharna Bari and Dalsingpara, will be built and owned by Indian Railways.
- Assam state of India:
  - "Kokrajhar–Gelephu line", 57 km long: From Kokrajhar in Assam in India to border town of Gelephu in Bhutan. The survey was completed in April 2023 and construction will be completed by 2026. This will be the first line to be constructed and after that remaining lines will be constructed.
  - Pathsala–Nganglam line, 40 km: from Pathsala in India to border town Nganglam (Naglam) in Bhutan.
  - Rangiya–Darrang–Samdrup Jongkhar line, 60 km: from Rangia & Darrang in India to bordertown Samdrup Jongkhar in Bhutan.

== Air ==
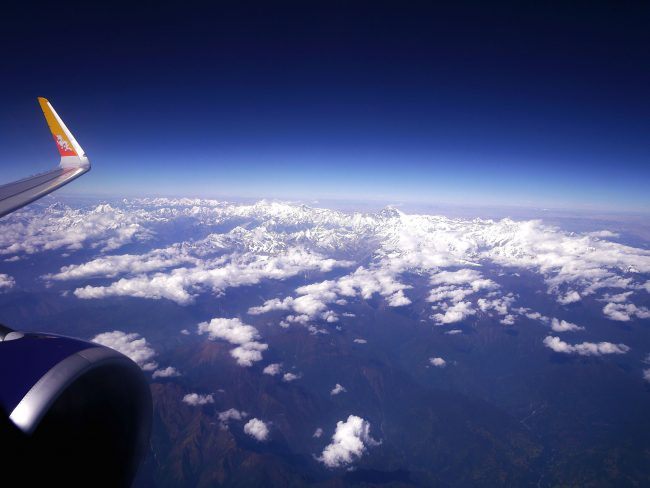
The Himalayas, seen on a flight from Delhi to Paro Airport on Drukair

Bhutan has four airports, Paro, Bathpalathang, Yongphulla, and Gelephu Airport. Paro, the country's only international airport, is in a steep-sided valley with its approaches restricted to visual flight rules. During the monsoon season, flights are often delayed by cloud cover. Drukair is the national carrier, connecting Paro with other countries.

The airport is one of the highest and most-challenging airports at which to land. Minimal equipment is available to pilots, and special training is required to land in the narrow valley on the short runway. Winds and bad weather may delay or cancel a flight, and the best travel times are April to May and October to November.

Bathpalathang and Yongphulla are Bhutan's domestic airports. The Royal Bhutanese Government's 10th Five-Year Plan (2008–13) included the construction of a domestic airport at Gelephu in Sarpang District. An international airport was planned for the Gelephu site, but the project's scope was downgraded to a domestic airport in October 2008. In January 2010, the Bhutanese Department of Civil Aviation indicated that the domestic airport at Gelephu may be expanded into an all-weather airport capable of international traffic in the future. Construction was due to begin in late 2010, with the airport commencing operation in June 2011.

== See also ==
- Tourism in Bhutan
