= Alii Palau Airlines =

Airline of Palau

IATA	ICAO	Call sign
RO	ROR	—
- Founded: 2022
- Ceased operations: 2023; 3 years ago
- Hubs: Roman Tmetuchl International Airport
- Fleet size: 1
- Destinations: 2
- Headquarters: Koror City, Koror, Palau
- Key people: James Goh (CEO)
- Website: https://www.flyaliipalau.pw

Alii Palau Airlines was an airline that operated flights from Roman Tmetuchl International Airport in Koror, Palau to Singapore's Changi Airport.

Operations were to begin on 12 September 2023, however this date was later moved. In October 2023, an agreement with Bhutanese airline Drukair was reached to operate Alii Palau Airlines' flights. Aili Palau's flights utilized Drukair's IATA code of KB.

The airline commenced operations on 23 November 2023, with a flight from Singapore to Koror, utilizing an Airbus A320neo. Only four round-trip flights were conducted, with Aili Palau's last flight being on 14 December 2023.

According to the airline's director Glenn Said, the suspension of flights was caused by lack of passenger demand due to a rise in COVID-19 cases in Singapore. It was initially expected that the airline would resume operations in February 2024, with plans for two weekly flights from Singapore to Koror.

== Destinations ==
During its operation, the airline operated a once weekly service from Singapore to Koror. Plans were made to increase the service to twice weekly from 21 December 2023, however the airline ceased operations before the additional flights were implemented.

Other destinations considered by the airline were Manila, Tokyo, Seoul-Incheon, Hong Kong, and Macau.

Country	City	Airport
Palau	Koror	Roman Tmetuchl International Airport^{[Hub]}
Singapore	Singapore	Changi Airport

== Fleet ==
Alii Palau Airlines operated a Airbus A320neo that was leased from Drukair. It was initially planned to utilize an aircraft from an operator in Myanmar, however due to economic sanctions against Myanmar, this plan was shelved.

== See also ==
- Belau Air, the only active airline of Palau
