= Tashi Group =

Conglomerate of companies in Bhutan

Tashi Group of Companies
- Founded: 1959; 67 years ago in Phuentsholing, Bhutan
- Headquarters: Bhutan
- Website: tashigroup.bt

The Tashi Group of Companies is the largest privately owned conglomerate of companies in Bhutan.

It was founded in 1959 in Phuentsholing, Bhutan.

Tashi Group has over 40 subsidiaries including Tashi Air (Bhutan Airlines), Tashi Infocomm, T-Bank, Druk School, etc. Tashi Group, the largest private company in Bhutan, operates a chemical plant, a ferrosilicon plant and a soft drinks bottling factory.
