= Five-Year Plans of Bhutan =

Series of national economic development plans in Bhutan

The Five-Year Plans of Bhutan are a series of national economic development plans created by the government of Bhutan since 1961.

The government of Bhutan has played an extensive role in its economy and development. Since 1961 the economy has been guided through development plans, which the Development Secretariat and later the Planning Commission directed, subject to the National Assembly's approval. In the World Bank's 1989 appraisal, "Coming late to the development scene, Bhutan was eager to avoid mistakes committed elsewhere. Although strongly dependent on foreign aid, it was determined to follow its own set of priorities, keep public finance on an even keel, build up a well-trained but lean bureaucracy, and prevent environmental damage from overexploitation of the forests or uncontrolled growth of tourism." To help avoid further mistakes, the government used traditional social institutions and involved people at the local level in planning and implementation for their own district, subdistrict, or village. "As a result of these factors," said the World Bank, "development in Bhutan has been remarkably free from seeing economic, social, or cultural disruption."

== History ==
India fully funded the First Development Plan (1961–66). The first plan, for which Nu107.2 million was allocated, and the Second Development Plan (1966–71), for which Nu202.2 million was allocated, focused primarily on developing modern budgeting techniques. According to some foreign observers, the first two plans failed to set priorities and achieve economic-sector integration as might be expected of genuine development planning. The major economic-planning emphasis was on public works, primarily roads; forestry; health care; and education.

To make planning more effective, the Planning Commission was established to formulate the Third Development Plan (1971–76), and the Druk Gyalpo served as its chairman until 1991. Under the third plan, public works, still primarily roads, continued to take a significant share of the Nu475.2 million development budget (17.8 percent) but had decreased from its 58.7 percent share in the first plan and its 34.9 percent share in the second plan. Education gradually increased (from 8.8 to 18.9 percent) in the first three plans. The second and third plans were paid for primarily by India, although about 3 percent of total funding became available through the United Nations, starting with the Third Plan. Despite amounts budgeted for planned development, there were additional capital expenditures outside the formal development plan, including public works (mostly road construction) and hydroelectric plants.

One of the major achievements of the Fourth Development Plan (1976–81) was the establishment of district (or dzongkhag) planning committees to stimulate greater local involvement, awareness of government development policies, and local development proposals. The committees, however, had no decision-making powers. Nevertheless, agricultural and animal husbandry came to the fore, taking 29 percent of the Nu1.106 billion allocated for the fourth plan. It was during the fourth plan that Bhutan made its first effort to establish the value of the GDP, which in 1977 amounted to Nu1.0 billion. In that year, GDP was distributed among agricultural and related activities, 63.2 percent; services, 13.1 percent; government administration, 10.4 percent; rental income, 8.1 percent; and manufacturing and mining, 5.2 percent. Per capita GDP was estimated at US$105.

The Fifth Development Plan (1981–87) sought the expansion of farmland to increase the production of staple crops, such as rice, wheat, barley, maize, buckwheat, and millet. The plan also emphasized improvements in livestock, soil fertility, plant protection, and farm mechanization. Its total planned allocation was Nu4.3 billion, but the actual outlay came to Nu4.7 billion. Financing the planning process grew increasingly complex, as indicated by the fifth plan's multilateral funding sources. However, domestic revenue sources for development planning had increased significantly, and the fifth plan included development projects that would further decrease dependence on external assistance. Such concepts as self-reliance in each district, decentralization of the development administration, greater public input in decision making, better control of maintenance expenditures, and more efficient and effective use of internal resources became increasingly important.

The Sixth Development Plan (1987–92) focused on industry, mining, trade, and commerce (13.3 percent) and power generation projects (13.1 percent), with education's allocation decreasing slightly to 8.1 percent from 11.2 percent during the fifth plan. At Nu9.5 billion, the sixth plan was considerably more expensive than its predecessor. It included programs that, if successfully implemented, would mean far-reaching reforms. The goals included strengthening government administration, promoting the national identity, mobilizing internal resources, enhancing rural incomes, improving rural housing and resettlement, consolidating and improving services, developing human resources, promoting public involvement in development plans and strategies, and promoting national self-reliance. Perhaps the key ingredient, self-reliance, promised to provide for more popular participation in the development process and to result in improved rural conditions and services as well as better government administration and human resource development. With greater self-reliance, it was hoped that Bhutan would begin exploiting markets in neighboring countries with manufacturing, mining, and hydroelectric projects in the 1990s. Faced with rising costs, Bhutan postponed some projects requiring large inputs of capital until the Seventh Development Plan (1992–96).

No major changes were expected in overall sectoral development in the seventh plan. Preliminary planning indicated emphasis on "consolidation and rehabilitation" of developments achieved under previous plans, more attention to environmental concerns, and enhancement of women's roles in economic and social development.

From their inception, the development plans have been aimed at energizing the rest of the economy and promoting economic self-reliance. Windfall revenues from export receipts normally were used to reduce foreign debt and dependence on foreign aid. Planners also sought to involve the immediate beneficiaries of economic development. Representatives in the National Assembly and district officials were encouraged to become involved in projects, such as roads and bridges, schools, health care facilities, and irrigation works, in their district. Some costs for the projects were borne through self-help, such as households providing labor. Government planners also have endeavored to increase rural income through initiatives in the farming sector, such as stock-breeding programs, promotion of cash crops, and advanced agro-technology. Central government efforts also were aimed at increasing the quality of life by providing electrification, modern water and sanitation systems, better cooking equipment, and insulation for houses.

The latest Thirteens Five Year Plan (2024–2029) (13th FYP) initiates a strategic shift in addressing the country's changing needs in a globalised world through implementing Bhutan's guiding philosophy of GNH (Gross National Happiness). The Plan's ambitious aim is for Bhutan to become a High-Income GNH Economy by 2034. This follows the recent graduation of Bhutan from the UN's Least Developed Countries list to Developing Country status in December 2023. The focus for this five-year period is on transforming the economy by paying attention to the strengths of its people, building societal advancement through progress and ensuring prosperity through economic resilience. Concurrently to the Five Year Plan, His Majesty King Jigme Khesar has envisioned a project in a special administrative region of southern Bhutan, to create the Gelephu Mindfulness City. A planned large-scale urban project located in a proposed special administrative region in southern Bhutan forms part of Bhutan’s long-term national development strategy and seeks to establish Gelephu as an innovation-driven urban center that integrates economic growth with the principles of mindfulness, sustainability, and holistic well-being. The project is intended to combine modern urban planning with Bhutan’s development philosophy, emphasizing environmental stewardship, cultural preservation, and social well-being.

The Gelephu Mindfulness City is also designed to address key economic challenges identified in Bhutan’s 13th Five Year Plan, particularly the shortage of domestic employment opportunities for young people within the prime-age workforce. In recent years, a growing number of Bhutanese citizens have migrated abroad in search of improved economic prospects. By promoting a diversified urban economy focused on knowledge-based industries, sustainable finance, green technology, education, healthcare, and wellness-related sectors, the project aims to create employment, support entrepreneurship, and retain skilled human capital within Bhutan.

Investment facilitation for the Gelephu Mindfulness City is expected to involve coordination among government agencies and national investment promotion institutions. Invest Bhutan, Bhutan’s investment promotion entity, is expected to support efforts to attract domestic and foreign investment aligned with national development priorities. This includes promoting Bhutan as an investment destination and encouraging responsible investment that contributes to job creation, economic diversification, and long-term sustainable development consistent with Bhutan’s policy framework.
