= List of airports in Bhutan =

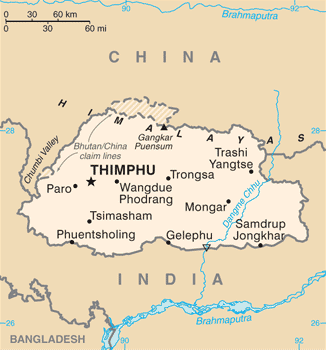
Map of Bhutan

This is a list of airports in Bhutan, sorted by location.

Bhutan, officially the Kingdom of Bhutan, is a landlocked country in South Asia, located at the eastern end of the Himalaya Mountains and bordered to the south, east and west by the Republic of India and to the north by Tibet. Bhutan is separated from the nearby state of Nepal to the west by the Indian state of Sikkim, and from Bangladesh to the south by West Bengal. The capital city is Thimphu.

== Airports ==
Airport names shown in bold have scheduled passenger service on commercial airlines.

Location	ICAO	IATA	Airport name	Coordinates	Runway	Elev.	Constructed	Status
Gelephu	VQGP	GLU	**Gelephu Airport**	26°53′04″N 090°27′51″E	11/29: 1500 m Asphalt	290 m	2012	Operational
Jakar	VQBT	BUT	**Bathpalathang Airport**	27°33′52″N 090°44′43″E	14/32: 1200 m Asphalt	2473 m	2011	Operational
Paro	VQPR	PBH	**Paro International Airport**	27°24′12″N 089°25′29″E	15/33: 1964 x 29 m Asphalt	2235 m	1968	Operational
Trashigang	VQTY	YON	**Yongphulla Airport** (Yonphula Airport)	27°15′22″N 091°30′55″E	12/30: 1266 x 37 m Asphalt	2743 m	1960s	Operational

Bagdogra Airport (26°40′52″N 088°19′43″E) in neighbouring India is also accessible for flights to Bhutan.

== See also ==
- Transport in Bhutan
- List of airports by ICAO code: V
