= Gelephu Airport =

Airport in Sarpang District, Bhutan

- IATA: GLU; ICAO: VQGP

Summary
- Airport type: Public
- Operator: Department of Civil Aviation
- Location: Sarpang District
- Elevation AMSL: 984 ft (300 m)
- Coordinates: 26°53′10.3848″N 090°27′47.0052″E

Map
- Location within Bhutan

Runways
Direction	Length		Surface
Direction	ft	m	Surface
11/29	4,921	1,500	Asphalt

Gelephu Airport (IATA: GLU, ICAO: VQGP) is located in Samtenling Gewog, about three kilometres (1.9 mi) from Gelephu in Sarpang District, Bhutan. The airport has been constructed on an area spanning over 500 acres (200 ha) and came into regular use in late 2017. It is one of only four airports in Bhutan.

== History ==
The airport was inaugurated in October 2012, but regular scheduled operations were delayed for five years due to its lack of certification from the Department of Civil Aviation of Bhutan and because of funding issues. The airport was initially planned as an international airport, but the plan was shelved in 2008. In January 2015, The Department of Civil Aviation told Kuensel that the airport had been closed to scheduled flights due to the need to construct a new terminal building and control tower. A spokesperson said it was hoped the new structures would be completed in February 2015, and at that point, "from our side it’ll be [ready to] open to scheduled flights." Despite this, it was reported that Drukair was unaware of the airport's reopening and stated that it would not launch commercial flights once it studied the market conditions to ensure scheduled operations were viable. After a brief period of flights in 2015, which were found to be uneconomic, flights were eventually re-commenced in November 2017 with financial support from the Royal Bhutanese Government.

In 2023, it was announced that a new international airport would be built as part of the proposed Gelephu Special Administrative Region. The existing domestic airport will remain operational.

In December 2025, Drukair launches the first scheduled international flights linking Gelephu to Kolkata in India.

== Airlines and destinations ==
Airlines	Destinations
Drukair	Kolkata, Paro

== See also ==
- Transport in Bhutan
- List of airports in Bhutan
