= Paro International Airport =

International airport in Bhutan

Paro Airport སྤ་རོ་གནམ་ཐང༌།
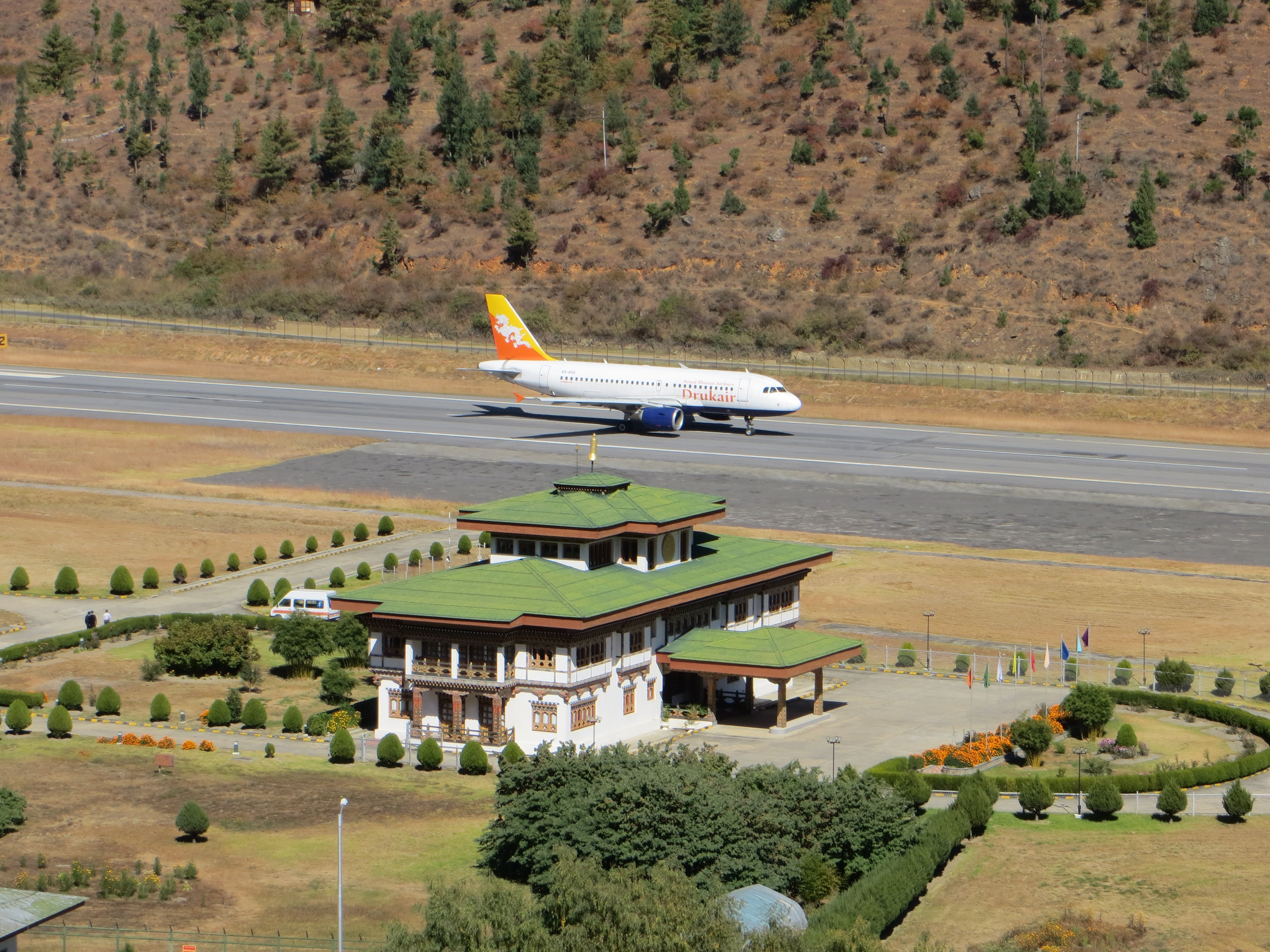
- IATA: PBH; ICAO: VQPR

Summary
- Airport type: Public
- Operator: Department of Civil Aviation of Bhutan
- Serves: Thimphu and Paro
- Location: Paro, Paro District, Bhutan
- Hub for: Bhutan Airlines; Drukair
- Elevation AMSL: 2,235 m (7,333 ft)
- Coordinates: 27°24′32″N 089°25′14″E
- Website: paroairport.com

Map
- Location within Bhutan

Runways
Direction	Length		Surface
Direction	m	ft	Surface
15/33	2,265	7,431	Asphalt

Statistics (2023)
- Passengers: 189,878 ▲14%
- Aircraft departures: 3,752 ▲64%

Paro International Airport (Dzongkha: སྤ་རོ་གནམ་ཐང༌།, romanized: paro gnam thang) (IATA: PBH, ICAO: VQPR) is the sole international airport of the four airports in Bhutan. It is 6 kilometres (3.7 mi; 3.2 nmi) from Paro in a deep valley on the bank of the river Paro Chhu. With surrounding peaks as high as 5,500 metres (18,000 ft), it is considered one of the world's most challenging airports, and only a very small number of pilots are certified to land at the airport.

Flights to and from Paro are allowed under visual meteorological conditions only and are restricted to daylight hours from sunrise to sunset, with additional restrictions in the afternoon during windy seasons. Paro airport was the only airport in Bhutan until 2011. The airport is accessible by road, 6 km (3.7 mi; 3.2 nmi) from Paro city, and 54 km (34 mi; 29 nmi) from Thimphu by Paro-Thimphu road.

== History ==
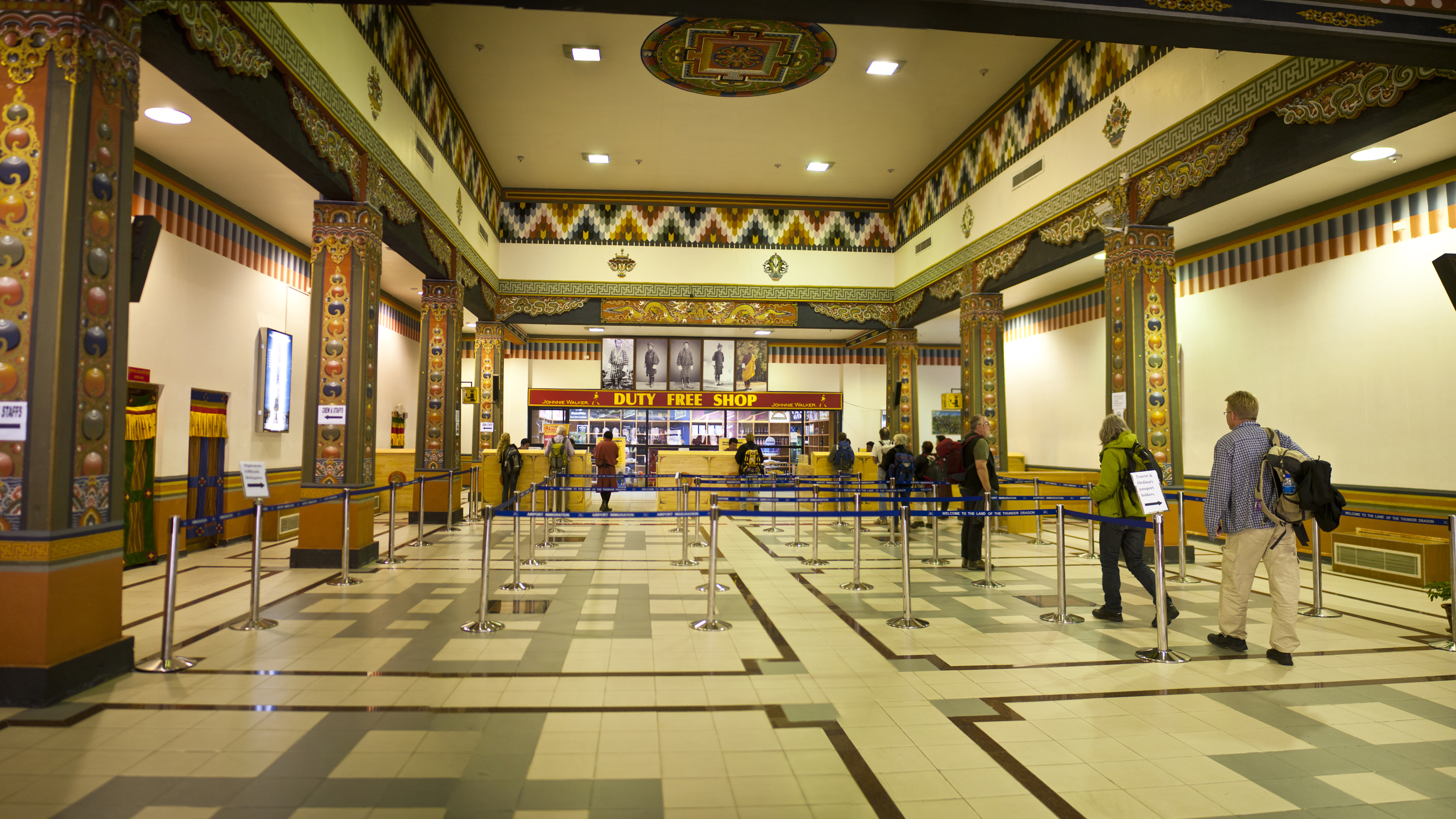
Airport interior, 2011

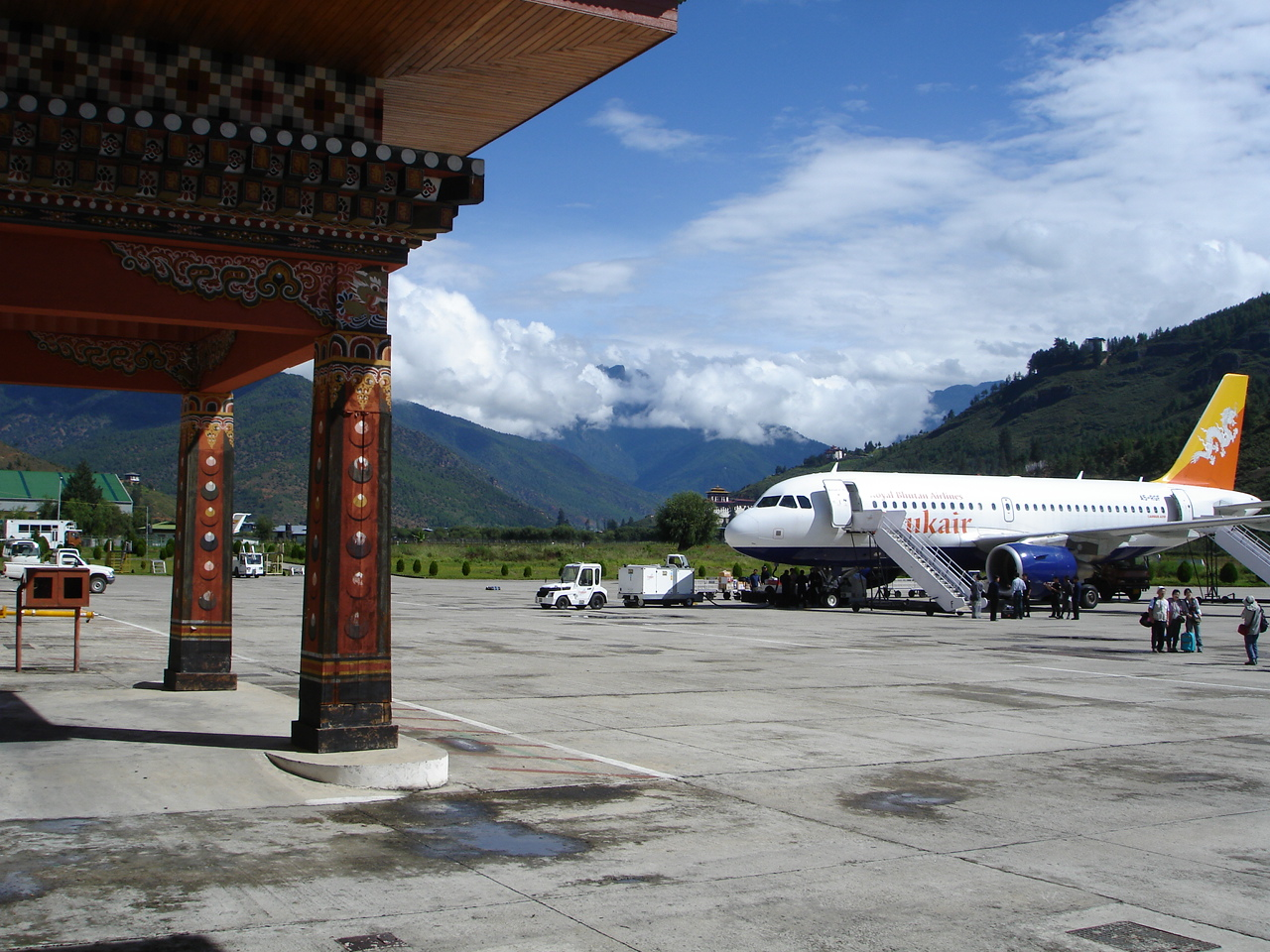
Drukair Airbus A319-115 parked at the airport terminal at Paro Airport in 2006

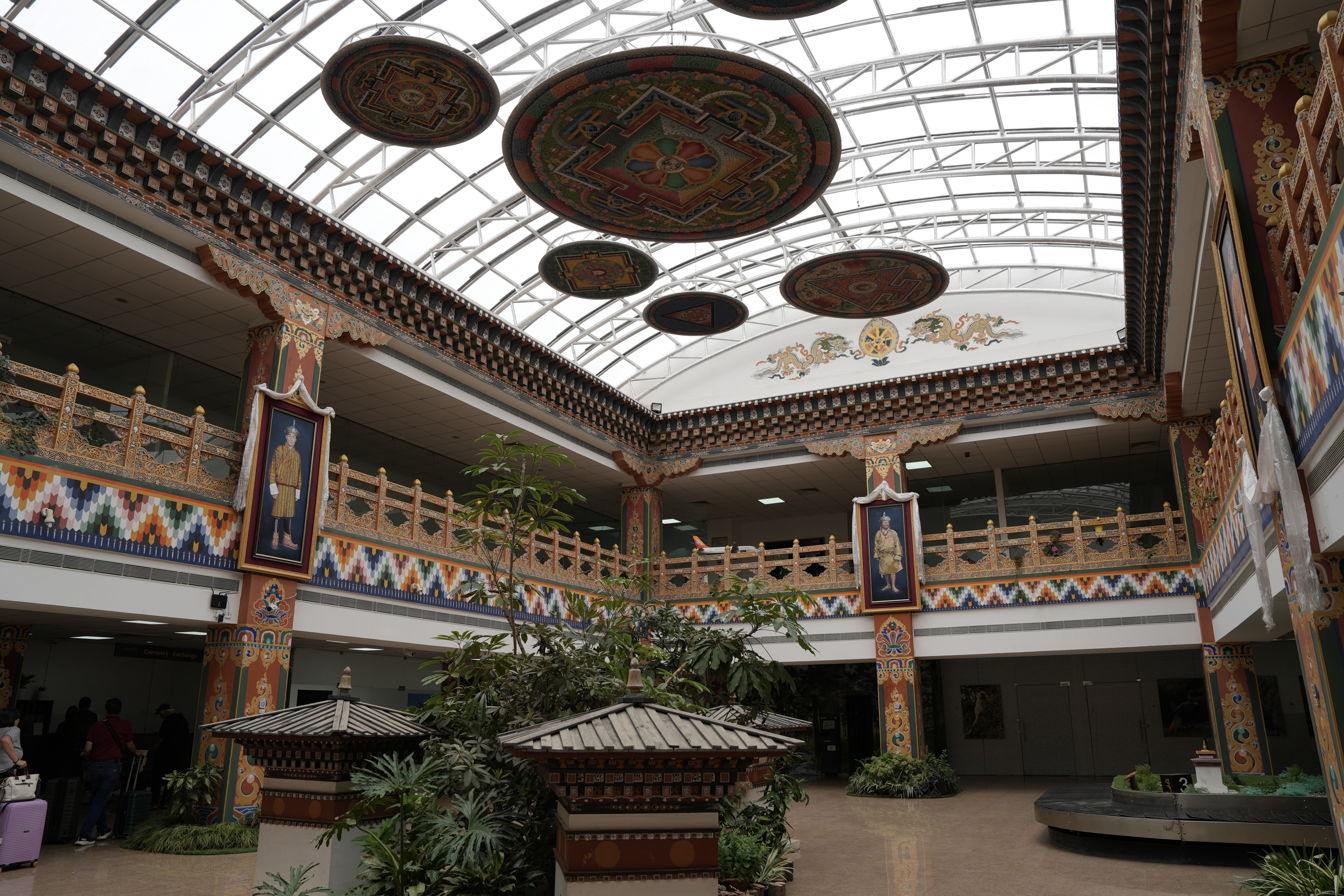
Baggage claim at Paro Airport, 2025

In 1968, the Indian Border Roads Organisation built an airstrip in the Paro valley, which was initially used for on-call helicopter operations by the Indian Armed Forces on behalf of the Royal Government of Bhutan. Bhutan's first airline, Drukair, was established by royal charter on 5 April 1981.

Paro Airport is deep in a valley 2,235 m (7,332 ft) above mean sea level and is surrounded by mountains as high as 5,500 m (18,000 ft). The airport was constructed with a 1,200 m (3,900 ft) runway, giving the Bhutanese government specific requirements for a choice of aircraft to be operated from Paro. They required an 18–20 seat STOL-capable aircraft with operating capabilities which included a high service ceiling, high rate of climb and high manoeuvrability. The major requirement for the aircraft was that it must be capable of flying Kolkata – Paro – Kolkata, a 1,200 km (750 mi; 650 nmi) round-trip, without refuelling, due to minimal infrastructure availability at Paro. Three aircraft types were considered after flight tests that had been conducted in India and Bhutan between 1978 and 1980; however, none was deemed suitable.

In mid-1981, the Indian government set up a committee to study its own requirements for a light transport aircraft. Based upon this study, the Bhutanese government ordered one Dornier 228-200 for delivery in January 1983, with the option for a second aircraft for delivery in late 1983. The first 18-seat Dornier 228-200 landed at Paro Airport on 14 January 1983. The exact time of landing, the number of passengers on board and even the direction the aircraft was parked on the airport apron were predetermined by the high lama of Paro Dzong.

Drukair inaugurated scheduled commercial flights from Paro on 11 February 1983, with Flight 101 departing Paro for Kolkata and returning the next day as Flight 102. At the time of service commencement, Paro Airport consisted of the runway, a two-room air traffic control building (with the ground floor acting as the check-in counter) and a departure lounge on the lawn. Before the establishment of the Department of Civil Aviation in January 1986, Drukair was also responsible for the operation and maintenance of the airport's infrastructure.

In 1990, the runway at Paro Airport was lengthened from 1,402 to 1,964 m (4,600 to 6,445 ft) and reinforced for heavier aircraft. A hangar was constructed for the aircraft, which was funded by the Indian government as part of the Paro Airport Development Project.

On 21 November 1988, Drukair's first jet, a BAe 146-100, was delivered to Paro Airport. In 2003, Drukair was seeking a replacement for the BAe 146 and on 19 October 2004 the airline's first Airbus A319-100 arrived in Paro.

Buddha Air became the first international airline to operate charters to Paro in August 2010. Tashi Air, Bhutan's first private airline, was started in December 2011. In 2012, it was reported that 181,659 passengers used the airport. By 2018, this number had grown to 397,599 and 6,761 flights were handled by the airport. The airport got 4 new structures: modified departure terminal building, cargo building, the relocated substation, and a parallel taxiway.

== Facilities ==
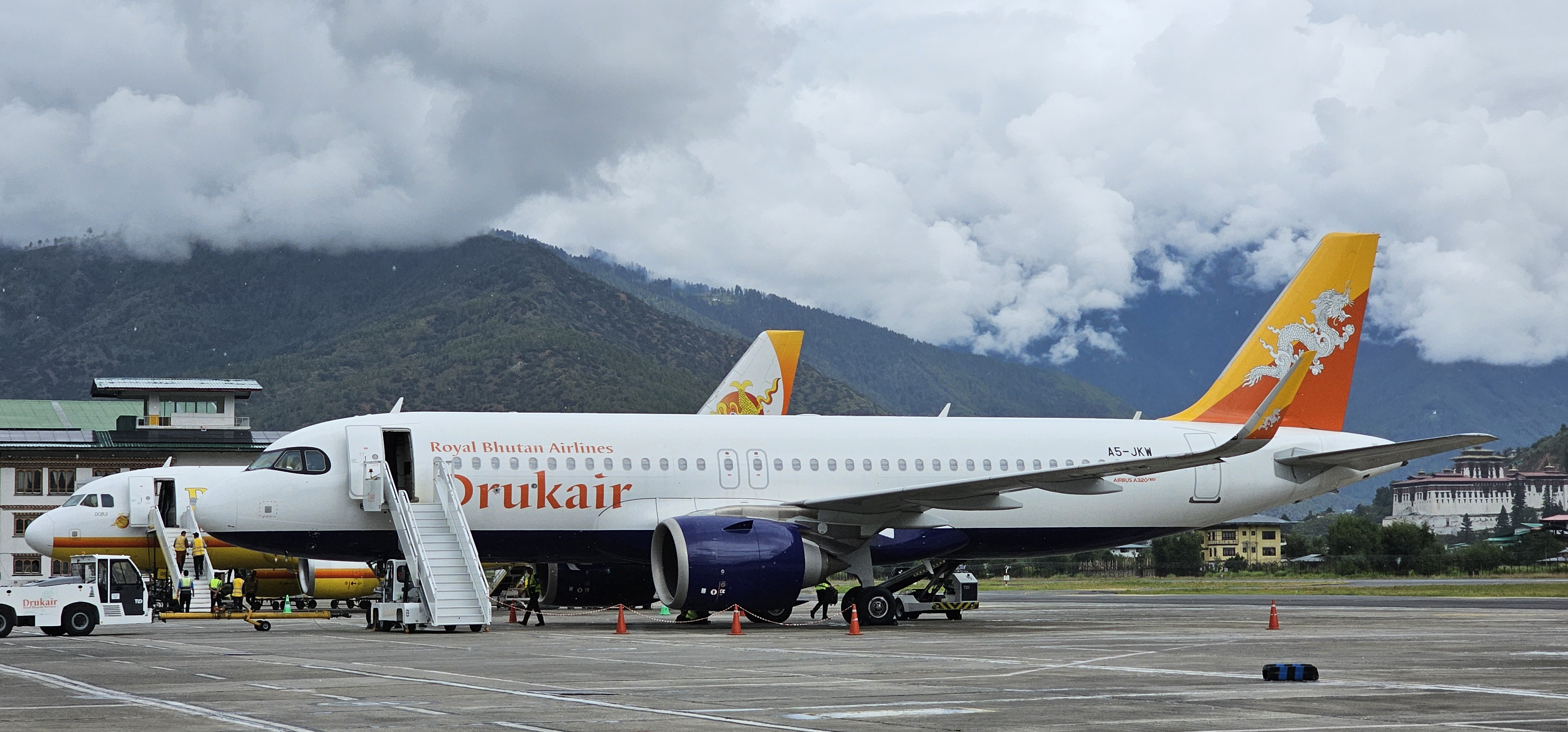
Paro International Airport, September 2025

The airport has a single 2,265 m (7,431 ft) asphalt runway, and there is one terminal building that was commissioned in 1999. In 2022, the interior was revamped, adding many art pieces.

== Airlines and destinations ==
Airlines	Destinations
Bhutan Airlines	Bangkok–Suvarnabhumi, Delhi, Kathmandu, Kolkata, Pokhara–International; Seasonal: Gaya, Hong Kong, Ho Chi Minh City, Mumbai
Drukair	Bagdogra, Bangkok–Suvarnabhumi, Delhi, Dhaka, Dubai–International, Gelephu, Guwahati, Jakar, Kathmandu, Kolkata, Singapore, Trashigang; Seasonal: Gaya, Kuala Lumpur–International, Seasonal charter: Ho Chi Minh City, Hong Kong, Tel Aviv

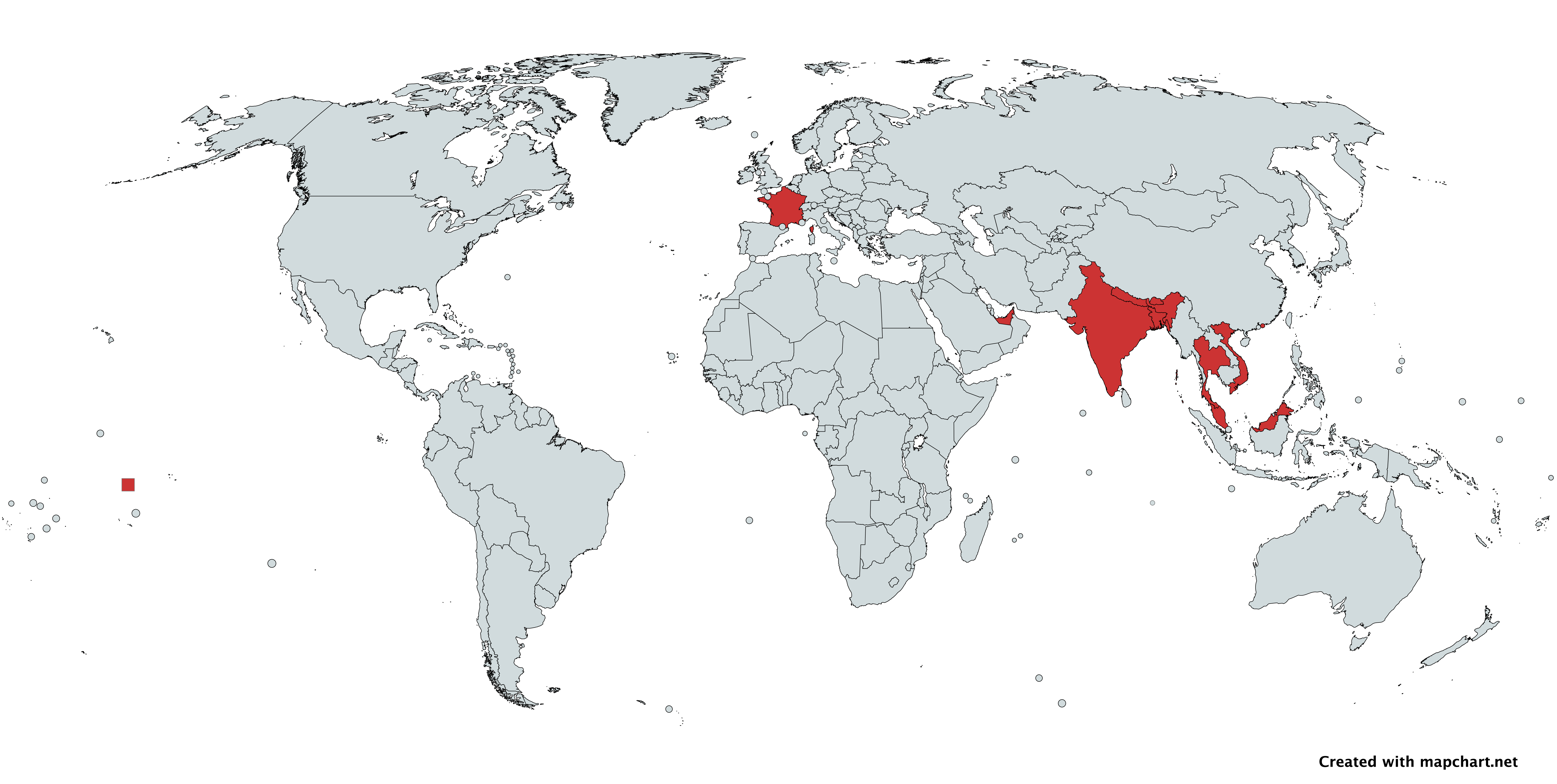
Paro International Airport passenger destinations

== See also ==
- Transport in Bhutan
- List of airports in Bhutan
