= Bhutan Airlines =

Airline from Bhutan

IATA	ICAO	Call sign
B3	BTN	BHUTAN AIRLINES
- Founded: 2011; 15 years ago
- Commenced operations: 7 December 2011; 14 years ago
- Hubs: Paro
- Focus cities: Bangkok; Kathmandu; Kolkata
- Fleet size: 2
- Destinations: 6
- Parent company: Tashi Group
- Headquarters: Thimphu, Bhutan
- Key people: Pema N Nadik (CEO); Ugyen Tenzin (GM, Commercial/Ground Ops)
- Website: www.bhutanairlines.bt

Tashi Air Pvt. Ltd, trading as Bhutan Airlines, is Bhutan's first private airline. Its head office is in Thimphu.

The airline resumed services on 10 October 2013, beginning its first international flights to India and Thailand. The airline served the cities of Jakar and Trashigang in Bhutan from their commencement until June 2012, suspending them due to increasing financial losses; however, following an agreement with the Bhutan government, the airline has resumed a full schedule of flights including Kolkata to Paro, Bhutan.

== History ==
The airline, then known as Tashi Air, was launched on 4 December 2011. The airline is a subsidiary of the Tashi Group. The airline began regular scheduled flights to Bathpalathang and Yonphula on 18 December 2011. After only six months of operation, however, the airline asked the Bhutanese Government for permission to suspend domestic flights.

The airline resumed services on 10 October 2013 as Bhutan Airlines, having secured the wet lease of a single Airbus A320 aircraft from a Lithuanian-based company. Flights to Kolkata and continuing on to Bangkok were offered initially. The airline was required to resume domestic flights by October 2014, per an agreement with the Government of Bhutan. Following the completion of its wet lease contract, Tashi Air acquired an Airbus A319 aircraft with a seating capacity of 122 passengers on 1 May 2014. It received a second Airbus A319 on 30 July 2014.

== Offices ==
Bhutan Airlines' head office is located in Tashi Mall, opposite Taj Tashi Hotel in Thimpu. The airline also has another office in Paro along with the airport office. The major offices of Bhutan Airlines are located in Kolkata, India and in Bangkok, Thailand - where they are represented by OMG Experience Co., Ltd. as GSA (General Sales Agent in Thailand). Other offices are located in Kathmandu, Nepal and in Malaysia.

== Destinations ==
As of July 2026, Bhutan Airlines serves the following destinations:

Country	City	Airport	Notes	Refs
Bhutan	Paro	Paro International Airport	Hub	
India	Delhi	Indira Gandhi International Airport		
India	Kolkata	Netaji Subhas Chandra Bose International Airport		
Nepal	Kathmandu	Tribhuvan International Airport		
Nepal	Pokhara	Pokhara International Airport		
Thailand	Bangkok	Suvarnabhumi Airport		

The airline was awaiting clearance during 2015 to operate flights to Bagdogra Airport, India. It was also hoping to start operations from Durgapur, once a memorandum of understanding was signed between Tashi Air and BAPL Durgapur in January 2016. Other planned destinations include Dhaka, Singapore, Dubai, and Hong Kong.

== Fleet ==
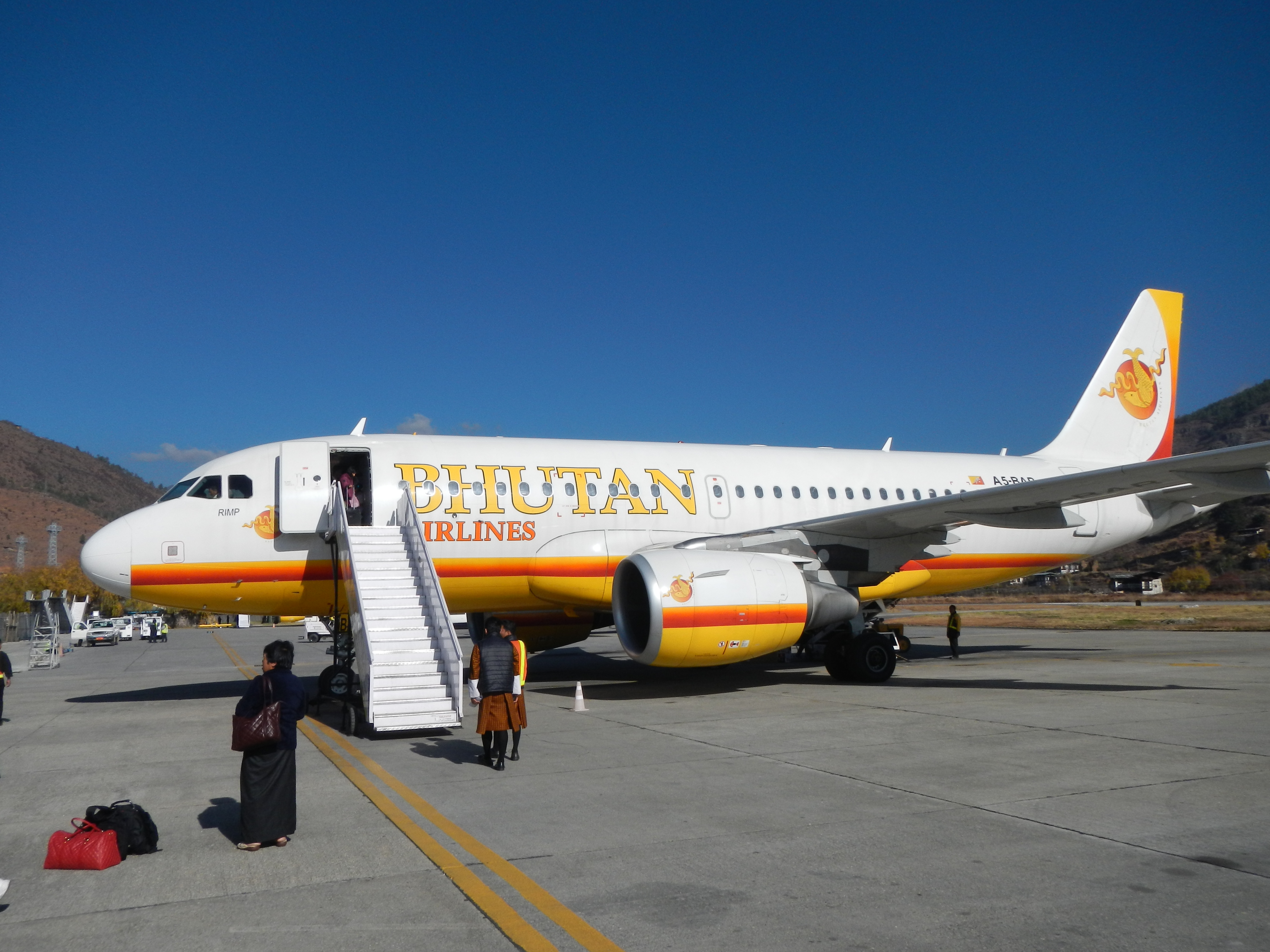
Bhutan Airlines Airbus A319-100

As of August 2025, Bhutan Airlines operates the following aircraft:

Bhutan Airlines Fleet
Aircraft	In Fleet	Passengers	Notes
Airbus A319-100	2	12/114	

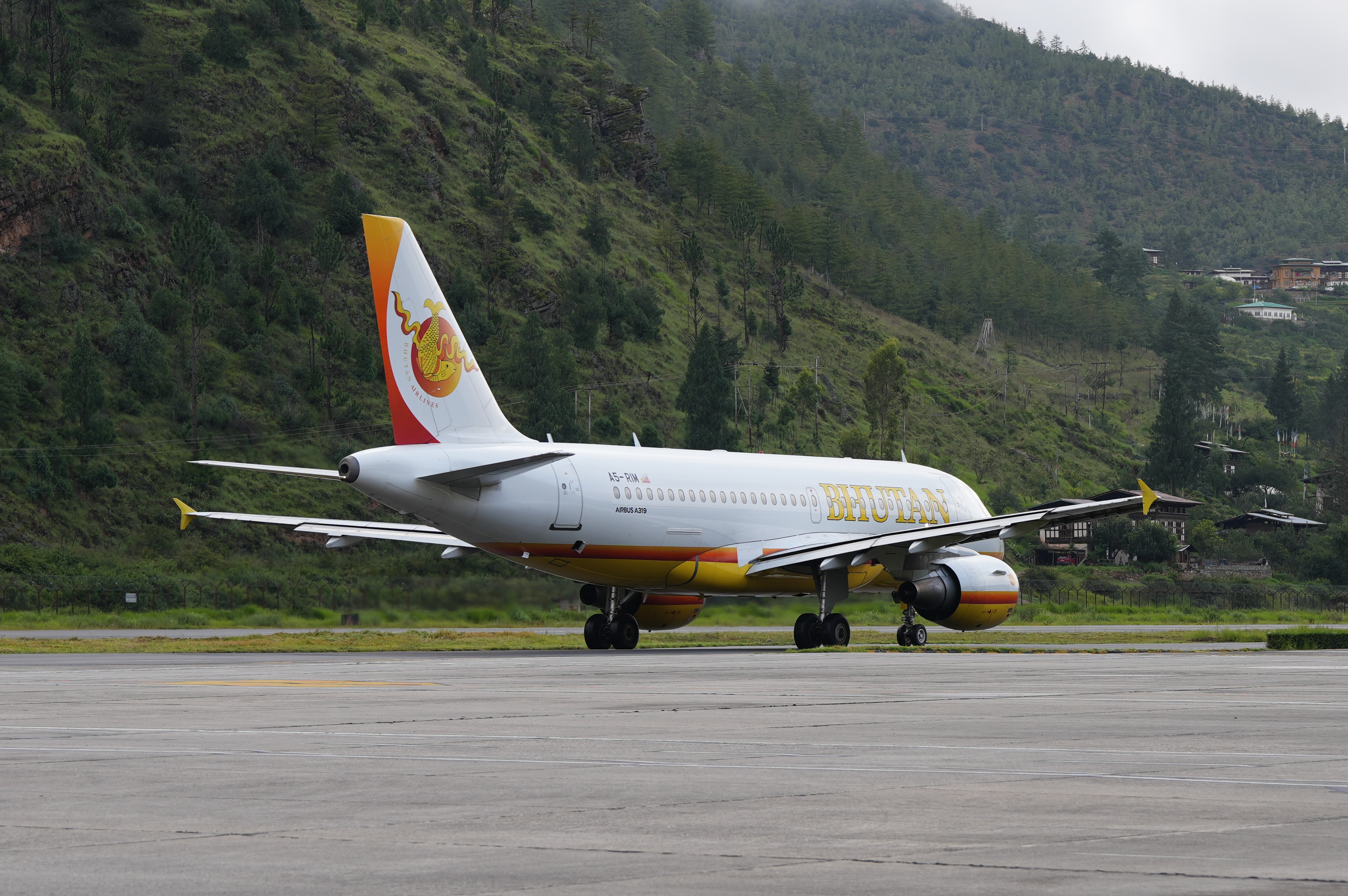
Bhutan Airlines Airbus A319-100 taxiing at Paro International Airport

== See also ==
- Druk Air
