= Yongphulla Airport =

Domestic airport near Trashigang, Bhutan

Yonphula Airport
- IATA: YON; ICAO: VQTY

Summary
- Airport type: Public
- Operator: Department of Civil Aviation
- Serves: Trashigang, Bhutan
- Elevation AMSL: 2,562 m (8,406 ft)
- Coordinates: 27°15′23″N 091°30′52″E

Map
- Location of airport in Bhutan

Runways
Direction	Length		Surface
Direction	m	ft	Surface
12/30	1,266	4,154	Asphalt
- Source: DAFIF

Yongphulla Airport (IATA: YON, ICAO: VQTY) (also known as Yonphula Airport) is one of four domestic airports in Bhutan. It is located near Trashigang.

== History ==
The airport was originally constructed by the Indian Border Roads Organisation in the 1960s. Yongphulla Airport was a simple airstrip at that time, located high atop mountainous terrain and largely unused. In the early 2000s, the airport was renovated with the aim of becoming a domestic airport. It was completed and inaugurated in December 2011. Six months later it closed for runway surface repairs, after Drukair suspended operations citing safety concerns. During construction, budget constraints had allowed only half of the runway to receive 'patchwork repairs'. The runway had not been resurfaced since the 1960s.

When the airport reopened in January 2013, following a complete resurfacing of the runway, Drukair scheduled flights to Yongphulla remained suspended because of regulatory requirements and further safety concerns. The ATR 42-500 used by Drukair for domestic services, while able to land on the 3.8% gradient runway, was prohibited from doing so in commercial flight operations, as there was a limitation in the aircraft manual of a 2% gradient. Additionally, Drukair highlighted concerns with a 'hump' in the runway, on the grounds that it may cause long-term structural damage to their aircraft. Drukair also asked for the two hillocks on either side of the runway to be removed on the grounds that the airport is prone to strong crosswinds and these represent a hazard to aircraft in such conditions.

In 2013, the airport closed to all air traffic, due to the lack of fire service cover and to allow significant structural repairs to the airfield.

The airport re-opened on 8 October 2017 after the runway was upgraded to international standards.

== Facilities ==
The airport resides at an elevation of 8,405 ft (2,562 m) above mean sea level. It has one runway designated 12/30 with an asphalt surface measuring 4,154 by 120 feet (1,266 m × 37 m).

== Airlines and destinations ==
Airlines	Destinations
Drukair	Paro

== See also ==
- Transport in Bhutan
- List of airports in Bhutan
