= Drukair =

Flag carrier of Bhutan

Drukair — Royal Bhutan Airlines

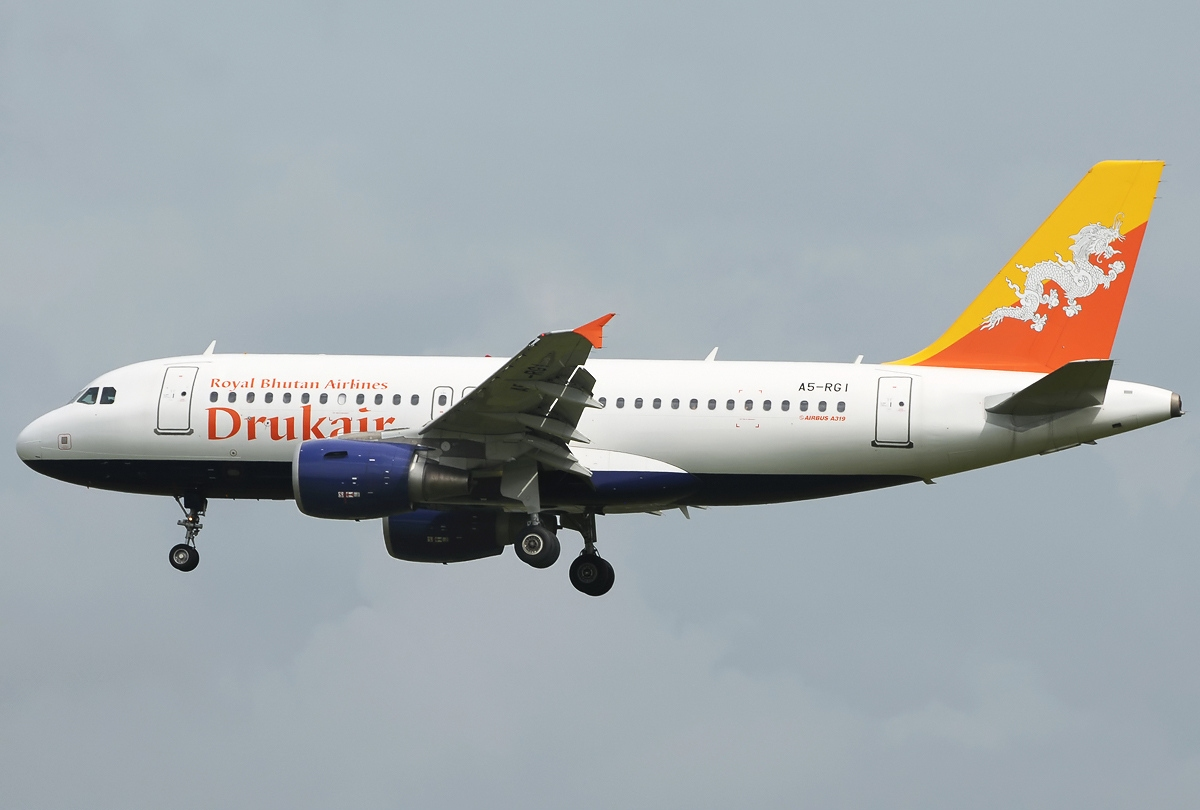
- Drukair Airbus A319
IATA	ICAO	Call sign
KB	DRK	ROYAL BHUTAN
- Founded: 5 April 1981; 45 years ago
- Commenced operations: 11 February 1983; 43 years ago
- Operating bases: Paro Airport
- Frequent-flyer program: HappinessSmiles
- Fleet size: 6
- Destinations: 19
- Parent company: Government of Bhutan; Druk Holding and Investments Limited
- Headquarters: Paro, Bhutan
- Key people: Tandi Wangchuk (CEO)
- Revenue: ▼Nu.2.8 billion (2015)
- Website: www.drukair.com.bt

Drukair Corporation Limited (Dzongkha: འབྲུག་མཁའ་འགྲུལ་ལས་འཛིན།), operating as Drukair — Royal Bhutan Airlines, is the flag carrier of the Kingdom of Bhutan, headquartered in the western dzongkhag of Paro.

Founded in 1981, ten years after Druk Gyalpo Jigme Dorji Wangchuck gradually began to open up the kingdom from self-imposed isolation, and seven years after welcoming its first foreign visitors, the airline commenced operations in 1983 with flights from Kolkata to Paro utilising Dornier 228 aircraft. A switch to BAe 146-100 equipment occurred in November 1988, and, to meet increased demand, those aircraft were replaced in 2004 with five Airbus A319s.

Drukair operates a modest scheduled flight network within the South Asian and Southeast Asian region from its base at Paro Airport and currently serves thirteen destinations in six countries.

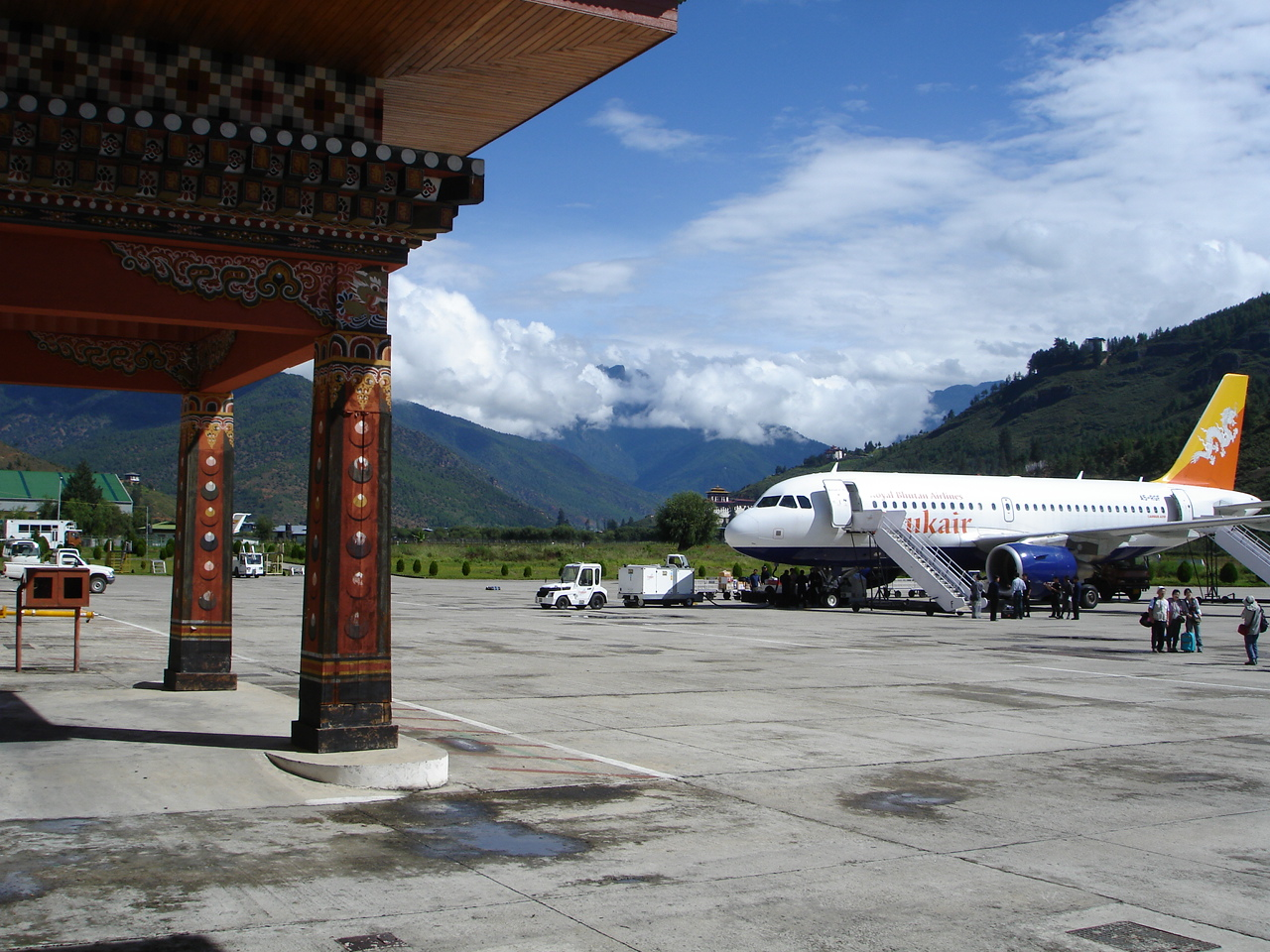
Drukair at the Paro Airport Terminal building

The airline also owns a small fleet of four Airbus A320 family jets, three A319 and one A320neo, one ATR 42 turboprop regional aircraft, and two A321XLRs on order.

== History ==
In 1968, the Indian Border Roads Organisation built an airstrip in the Paro valley, which was initially used for on-call helicopter operations by the Indian Armed Forces for the Royal Government of Bhutan. After consideration by King Jigme Singye Wangchuck and the Tshogdu, Drukair was established by royal charter on 5 April 1981, ten years after the Druk Gyalpo, King Jigme Dorji Wangchuck gradually began to open up the Kingdom from self-imposed isolation, and seven years after welcoming its first foreign visitors.

Paro Airport is located deep in a valley 2,235 metres (7,333 ft) above sea level, and is surrounded by mountains as high as 4,900 metres (16,100 ft). At the time, the runway was 1,200 metres (3,900 ft) in length, giving the Bhutanese government specific requirements for a choice of aircraft to be operated. They required an 18–20 seat STOL-capable aircraft with operating capabilities which included a high service ceiling, high rate of climb and high manoeuvrability. The major requirement for the aircraft was that it must be capable of flying Kolkata – Paro – Kolkata, a 1,200 kilometres (750 mi) round-trip flight, without refuelling, due to minimal infrastructure being available at Paro for this purpose. Three different aircraft types were considered after flight tests in India and Bhutan between 1978 and 1980; however, none was deemed suitable.

In mid-1981, the Indian government set up a committee to study its own requirements for a light transport aircraft. Based upon this competition, the Bhutanese government ordered one Dornier 228-200 for delivery in January 1983, with the option for a second aircraft for delivery in late 1983. The first 18-seat Dornier 228-200 landed at Paro Airport on 14 January 1983, the exact time of landing, the number of passengers on board and even the direction in which the aircraft was parked on the airport apron were predetermined by the high lama of Paro Dzong.

The airline inaugurated scheduled revenue flights on 11 February 1983, with Flight 101 departing Paro for Kolkata and returning the next day as Flight 102. For the first four weeks, the flight was operated three times a week, after which it was increased to a daily flight. At the time of service commencement, Paro Airport consisted of the runway, a two-room air traffic control building (with the ground floor acting as the check-in counter) and a departure lounge on the lawn. Before the establishment of the Department of Civil Aviation in January 1986, the airline was responsible for the operation and maintenance of airport infrastructure. The airline commenced flights to Dhaka in Bangladesh on 30 October 1986.

Summary of Drukair services between 1983 and 1987
	1983	1984	1985	1986	1987
Passengers flown	2,854	4,480	5,928	7,776	8,700
Distance flown ('000 km)	64	125	125	205	n/a
Revenue passenger kilometres ('000 km)	1,612	2,531	3,349	4,381	n/a

=== Jet era ===
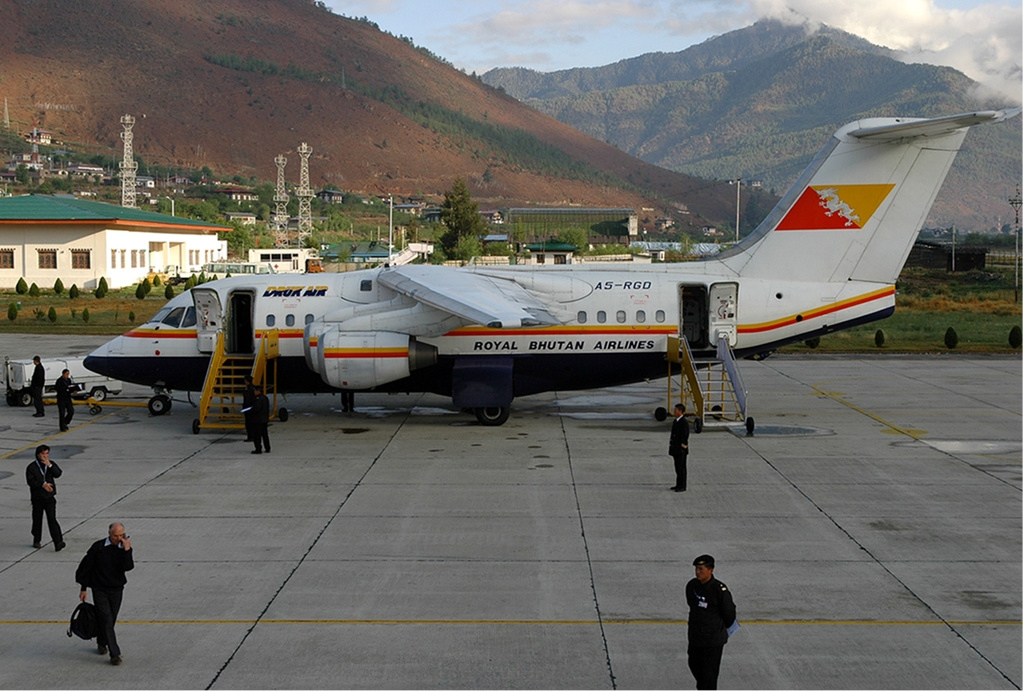
Drukair BAe 146-100 at Paro Airport in 2005

On 30 December 1987, a US$25 million order was placed with British Aerospace for a BAe 146-100 STOL regional jet. The purchase of the aircraft was financed by the government, obtaining, for the first time in the country's history, a commercial loan. In 1988, the airline's operational base was shifted from Kolkata to Paro Airport and the airline hired its first seven flight attendants, who were trained by Thai Airways International. On 21 November 1988, the BAe 146 was delivered to Paro Airport. With the introduction of the BAe 146, Drukair was able to widen its network to link Paro with Delhi on 26 November 1988, Bangkok on 28 January 1989 and Kathmandu in April 1989. In the first full year of operational service with the BAe 146, the airline achieved an average load factor of 50–60 percent, more than the 40 percent which was expected, carrying 12,732 passengers over the 1989 – 1990 period. In 1990, the runway at Paro Airport was lengthened from 1,400 metres (4,600 ft) to 2,000 metres (6,600 ft) and reinforced for heavier aircraft. A hangar was also constructed for the aircraft, which was funded by the Indian government as part of the Paro Airport Development Project.

The airline's only aircraft was requisitioned by King Jigme Singye on 9 November 1990, in order to allow the king and his party to travel to Tokyo for the coronation of Akihito as Emperor of Japan. From Japan, the King then travelled to Malé in the Maldives for the South Asian Association for Regional Cooperation summit between 21 and 23 November, and returned to Bhutan in order for the aircraft to re-enter service with the airline on 25 November. Due to a requirement stipulated by the Bhutanese government that all foreign tourists, with the exception of Indian nationals, enter and leave Bhutan by air, the country's tourism industry was brought to a halt, which saw the airline paying hefty penalties to disgruntled tour operators. This problem was somewhat alleviated when a second BAe 146 entered service in 1992, and on 11 November 1993, the airline introduced a 10 Executive Class on the aircraft. On 13 May 1991, Drukair was registered under the Companies Act of Bhutan. Service to Yangon, the capital of Myanmar, began on 6 January 1997.

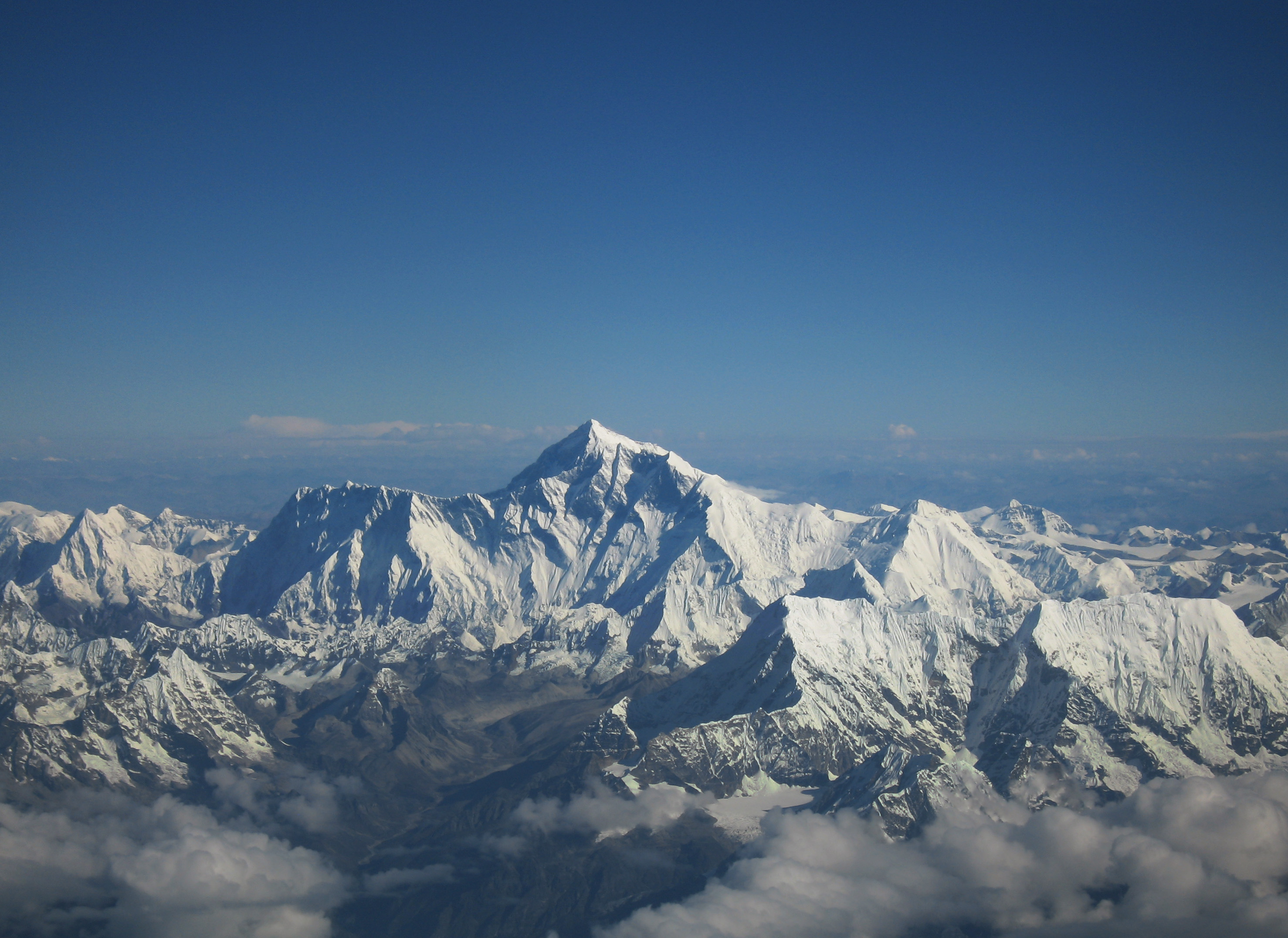
Those who fly between Kathmandu and Paro can see Mount Everest.

During 2000–2001, Drukair could operate with only one single aircraft for over a year due to a corrosion defect in its A5-RGD aircraft in the wing tanks that was detected during a check at Woodford. The wings were replaced. In 2002, an RJ70 was wet-leased from airBaltic to cover for maintenance to A5-RGE.

Drukair became the launch customer for the Avro RJX-85 in April 2000 when it placed an order with BAE Systems for two aircraft, with deliveries initially scheduled to take place in November 2001 and January 2002. Delays in the first flight and certification of the RJX pushed back expected delivery to Drukair to after April 2002. BAe Systems cancelled the RJX program in November 2002, due to receiving orders from only two airlines, Drukair and British European. With British European threatening legal action to enforce their contract with BAE Systems, the aircraft manufacturer offered to fulfil the contract for Drukair, although airline management decided against acquiring the aircraft, citing potential problems with sourcing spare parts for the aircraft in future.

In order to find a replacement for the 2 BAe 146s, Drukair management fielded submissions from Airbus, Boeing and Embraer to determine their products' suitability to meet Drukair's stringent operational requirements. Bombardier was also invited by management to demonstrate the CRJ900 regional jet, however, the airline was advised by Bombardier the aircraft would be unsuited for operations at Paro. In February 2002, the Airbus A319 became the largest aircraft to ever land at Paro Airport, when Airbus demonstrated the aircraft to the airline. By October, Boeing had withdrawn from the competition due to not being able to source an aircraft to demonstrate to the airline. With the Embraer E-190 yet to fly, it was expected that Drukair would order the A319. However, the government had concerns regarding financing for the purchase, and in October the final decision was delayed. After a short period of time, the government instructed management to begin evaluations once again, and a Boeing 737-700 conducted eleven test flights at Paro Airport in February 2003, in which it was demonstrated it met the requirements of the airline for operation into Paro.

Airbus signed a memorandum of understanding with Drukair in July 2003 for two 114-seat Airbus A319-115, powered by two CFM56-5B engines, for delivery in the second half of 2004. The purchase of the two jets, valued at 3,534.36 million Bhutanese ngultrum (BTN), was the biggest single purchase ever made by Bhutan, and was largely responsible for a 250 percent increase in the Bhutanese trade deficit over the previous year for the financial year 2004–2005. The Bhutanese government issued BTN 1,767.18 million in government bonds to pay for one aircraft and for only the second time in Bhutan's history intended to seek a commercial loan for the other aircraft. However, in October 2004 it announced it would instead seek a soft loan for this purpose.

On 11 November 2003, the king's birthday, Drukair initiated services to Gaya, India. Bodh Gaya, 10 kilometres (6 mi) from Gaya, is the site of the Mahabodhi Temple where Siddhārtha Gautama, the Buddha, reached enlightenment, and 30,000–40,000 Bhutanese make the pilgrimage every year. Pilgrims have previously made the pilgrimage to Bodh Gaya via a 2–3-day overland trip from the Bhutanese border town of Phuntsholing, and Drukair management plans on acquiring 20–30% of this traffic, although the airline had yet to record a profit on the route as of February 2006. The following month, as a result of Royal Bhutan Army efforts to expel from Bhutan territory Indian separatist insurgent groups, notably the United Liberation Front of Asom and the National Democratic Front of Bodoland, flights to Dhaka were suspended from 29 December in order to prevent insurgents from using Drukair flights to escape to alleged hideouts in Bangladesh.

=== Airbus era ===
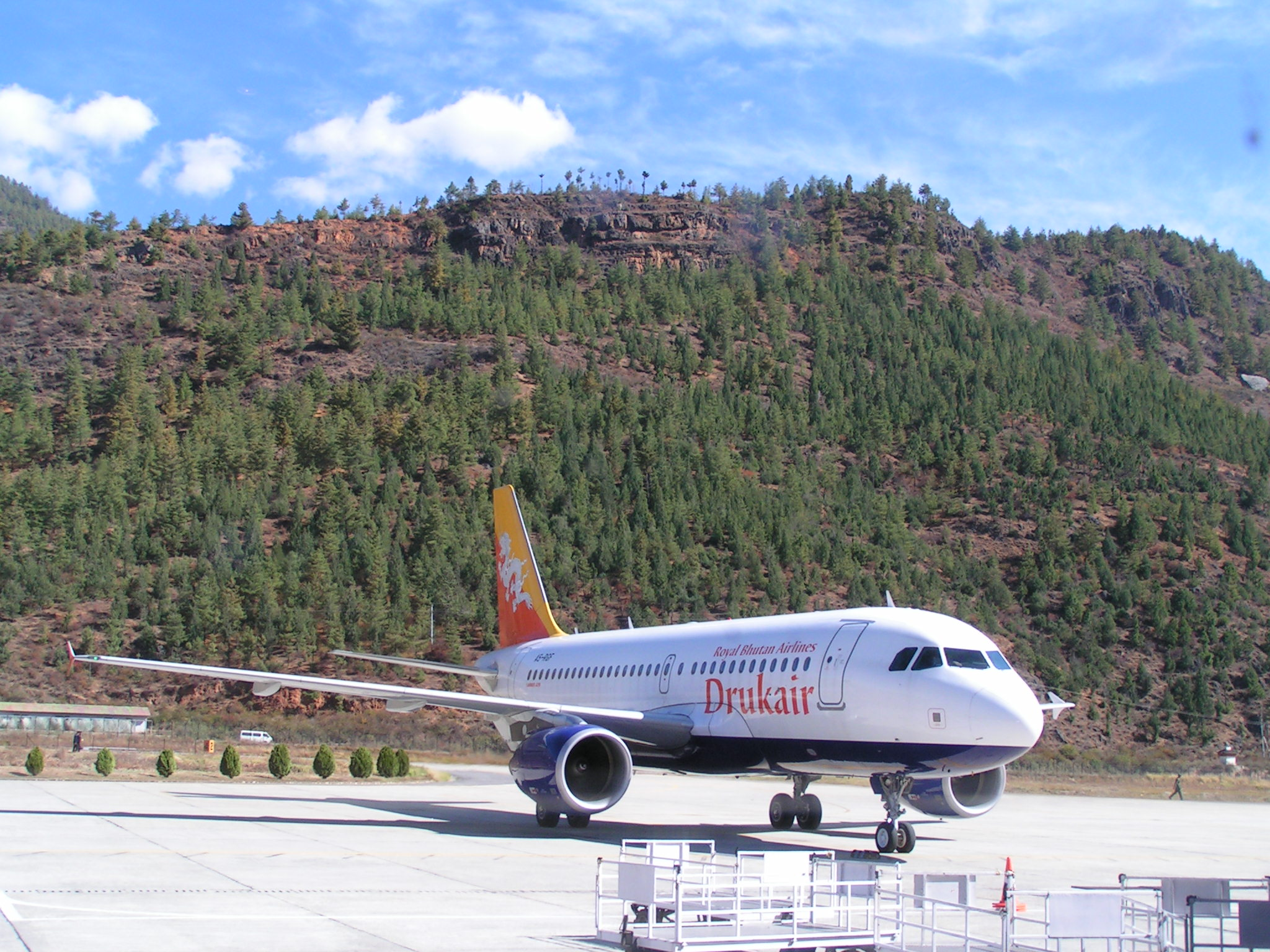
Druk Air Airbus A319 at Paro Airport

The first Airbus A319 arrived in Bhutan on 19 October 2004, the date chosen after a Buddhist astrologer was consulted to ensure the aircraft arrived in Bhutan on an auspicious day in the Buddhist calendar. Before entering service on commercial flights on 31 October 2004, Drukair took their A319 on a country-wide flight in honour of the ascension of Crown Prince Jigme Khesar Namgyel Wangchuck to the Chhoetse Penlop. The second aircraft was delivered by Airbus to Drukair in December 2004. On 31 August 2012, Druk Air took delivery of a third Airbus A319.

In July 2005, the governments of India and Bhutan signed a new bilateral air services agreement which increased the allowable number of weekly flights between the two countries from 12 to 49. In addition to destinations already served by Drukair, the cities of Mumbai, Chennai and Guwahati were included in their services agreement, with Bhutan being granted fifth freedom rights from several Indian cities to onward destinations such as Yangon, Dhaka and Singapore.

Domestic helicopter service was inaugurated in November 2005, in line with a resolution by the Council of Ministers in April 2001 which stated that domestic services should be introduced. Thirty heliports across the country were identified, and the introduction of services saw, for example, the 550 kilometres (340 mi) trip from Thimphu to Trashigang taking only one hour, instead of two to three days. The Eurocopter Ecureuil helicopter operated by the Nepalese operator, Air Dynasty, had by January 2006 seen 30 hours of service, netting Drukair US$3,000 in profits.

Flights to Dhaka, suspended since 29 December 2003, resumed on 23 October 2006, and the airline was given rights to fly to Chittagong and Cox's Bazar by the Bangladeshi authorities. The airline announced plans in July 2007 to start scheduled flights to Mumbai via Kathmandu from March 2008, inline with the strategy of Drukair management to increase the number of Indian tourists travelling to Bhutan during the low season months of June through August and November through February. These plans were put on hold in March 2008, due to Paro Airport not being able to handle night flights and the airline only being able to secure landing slots at Mumbai's Chhatrapati Shivaji International Airport at 3 am. Plans for services to Hong Kong, Singapore, Abu Dhabi, Dubai and Sharjah were also shelved.

The airline posted its first profit in 2007 of BTN 31.15 million. The two BAe 146 aircraft were sold to Star Perú in October 2007 for US$3.3 million, and left Bhutan for Peru in November and December 2007.

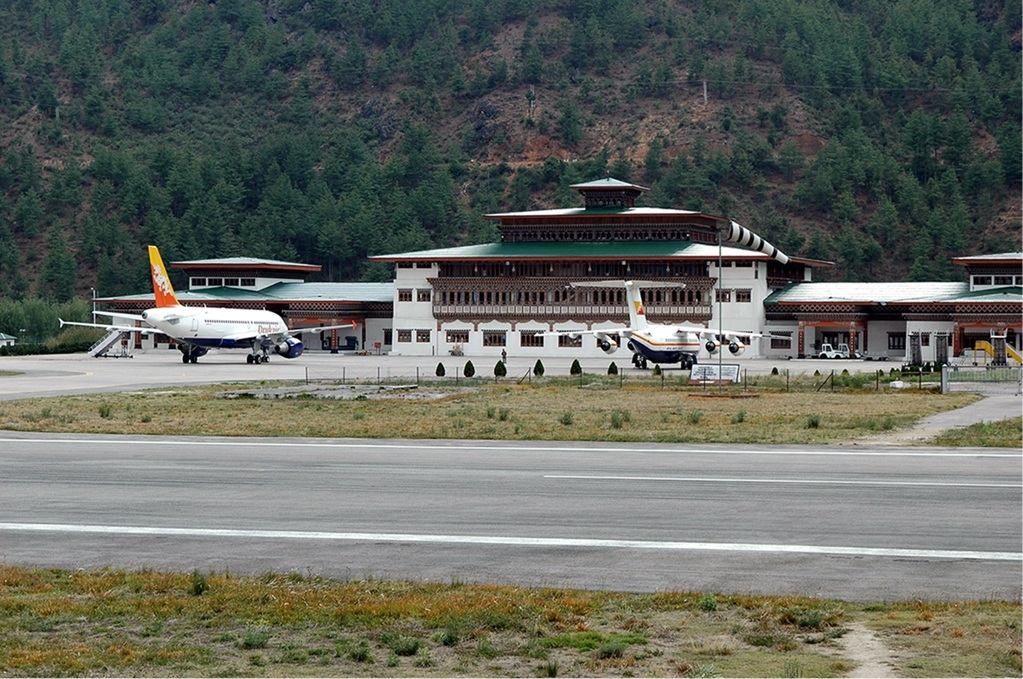
Drukair Airbus A319 and BAe 146 at Paro Airport in 2005

Druk Gyalpo Jigme Khesar Namgyel Wangchuck on 11 November 2007 issued a Royal Kasho establishing Druk Holding and Investments Limited, a holding company which would manage existing and future investments of the Royal Bhutanese government. As a result, seven government-owned companies, including Drukair, had their ownership transferred from the Ministry of Finance to the newly formed holding company. Incorporated on 13 November 2007, Druk Holding and Investments announced in December 2007 that given Bhutan's tourism industry being reliant on Drukair, the head of the government agency overseeing tourism development in Bhutan would become the chairperson of Drukair, and would be responsible for improving the performance of the national airline.

In March 2008, Drukair introduced a new uniform for its flight attendants, consisting of a contemporary kira and tego. The uniforms were introduced for the centenary celebrations of the monarchy, as well as the airlines own silver jubilee. The uniform was chosen by way of a competition in which five Bhutanese fashion designers submitted entries, with the winner receiving a BTN 75,000 prize. The textiles used in the new uniform was chosen via a competition which was jointly organised by Drukair and the United Nations Development Programme to promote the Bhutanese textile industry and culture.

Although the government of Bhutan goes to great lengths to prevent outside influences from intruding on Bhutanese culture, Drukair is not immune to problems which affect the airline industry and the world community at large. In June 2008, citing hikes in the price of oil and the need to contain operational costs, the airline reduced frequencies across its network and announced an increase in airfares to offset the increased costs, whilst taking advantage of the lower cost of jet fuel at Delhi, Kolkata and Bangkok airports. Due to its small network which is reliant on fifth-freedom rights, Drukair regularly leases its aircraft to other airlines, such as Myanmar Airways International and Bangkok Airways in order to keep utilisation rates on its aircraft higher than they would under normal circumstances, whilst at the same time earning extra revenue.

The airline was due to begin flights on 20 April 2009 to Bagdogra Airport in India, but had to delay the inaugural flight due to the lack of immigration and customs facilities at the airport. The inaugural flight to Bagdogra Airport left Paro Airport on 18 June 2009, making Drukair the first international airline to operate into the airport. In Bagdogra, a ceremony was held which was attended by S. M. Krishna, the Indian Minister for External Affairs, and Lyonpo Ugyen Tshering, the Bhutanese Minister of Foreign Affairs.

== Contemporary developments ==
Until 23 August 2010 Drukair was the only airline flying into Bhutan.

The airline is important for Bhutan and the Bhutanese people, connecting Bhutan with the outside world and supporting tourism and export markets.

In October 2009, the Bhutanese government planned construction works for an airstrip in Yongphulla. The airstrip, which was expected to be 3,900 feet (1,200 m) in length and operational by March 2010, would allow for service by small aircraft in the 15–16 seat category. The project was being financed with Nu. 34 million from the budget which was previously allocated to the development of domestic helicopter services. The airstrip would only be operational during the morning hours due to high winds in the afternoon, making safe operations risky.

Drukair is conducting a feasibility study into operating flights to the airstrip from Paro, as well as two others which are under construction at Bathpalathang and Gelephu.

In 2006, the Indian government, acting for the Bhutanese government, conducted a feasibility study into the viability of an international airport near the southern Bhutanese town of Gelephu. In the five-year plan (which covers 2008–2013) the sum of BTN 2,826 million had been allocated by the Bhutanese government for development of the new airport. A preliminary survey was conducted by India in May 2006 and the survey team from the Airports Authority of India was to return and complete the final survey in September 2006. In October 2008 the project was shelved, and the Bhutanese government decided that the airport at Gelephu would be used for domestic flights only.

Since then, the construction of a domestic airport at Gelephu has been scheduled to commence in late 2010 with the airport proposing to start operations in June 2011. The Bhutanese Department of Civil Aviation (DCA) has indicated that Gelephu's will be an 'all-weather' airport that may be able to accept some international traffic in the future.

Under the Vision 2020 Plan, the Royal Bhutanese Government has identified the requirement for improved external air links by 2017, in an effort to increase tourism revenue 100% by 2012 and 150% by 2017. Drukair is conducting feasibility studies into the commencement of operations to either Hong Kong or Singapore by March 2011. The airline's commercial manager has stated that preliminary studies show that Bhutanese traffic to Singapore would consist mainly of official travel, whilst traffic to Hong Kong would be mainly commercial, with good prospects for tourism development.

On 21 April 2010, an ATR 42 turboprop regional aircraft was delivered to Paro under a nine-month lease. The aircraft was used on flights from Paro to Kolkata and Kathmandu, and was on standby during the South Asian Association for Regional Cooperation summit in Thimphu at the end of April. Drukair announced its intention to join the International Air Transport Association in 2009.

During February 2018, Druk air performed a few charter flights to Hong Kong and additional charter flights were on slate during the following months. The airline had received request for charter flights to other destinations in Asia. It was also reported that Druk air would be adding an Airbus A320neo aircraft as well as purchasing a new ATR-42-600 aircraft.

Drukair took delivery of its new ATR 42-600 on 22 October 2019. This was followed by the delivery of the Airbus A320neo in April 2020.

== Destinations ==
Drukair operates scheduled flights to the following destinations:

Country	City	Airport	Notes	Refs
Bangladesh	Dhaka	Shahjalal International Airport		
Bhutan	Gelephu	Gelephu Airport		
Bhutan	Jakar	Bathpalathang Airport		
Bhutan	Paro	Paro Airport	Hub	
Bhutan	Trashigang	Yongphulla Airport		
India	Bagdogra	Bagdogra International Airport		
India	Delhi	Indira Gandhi International Airport		
India	Gaya	Gaya Airport	Seasonal	
India	Guwahati	Lokpriya Gopinath Bordoloi International Airport		
India	Kolkata	Netaji Subhas Chandra Bose International Airport		
India	Mumbai	Chhatrapati Shivaji Maharaj International Airport	Terminated	
Israel	Tel Aviv	David Ben Gurion International Airport	Seasonal charter	
Japan	Tokyo	Narita International Airport	Terminated	
Myanmar	Yangon	Yangon International Airport	Terminated	
Nepal	Kathmandu	Tribhuvan International Airport		
Nepal	Pokhara	Pokhara International Airport	Charter and future destination	
Palau	Koror	Roman Tmetuchl International Airport	Chartered by Alii Palau Airlines	
Singapore	Singapore	Changi Airport		
Taiwan	Taipei	Taoyuan International Airport	Charter	
Taiwan	Taichung	Taichung International Airport	Charter	
Thailand	Bangkok	Suvarnabhumi Airport		
Timor-Leste	Dili	Presidente Nicolau Lobato International Airport	Terminated (chartered by Air Timor)	
United Arab Emirates	Dubai	Dubai International Airport		
Vietnam	Ho Chi Minh City	Tan Son Nhat International Airport	Charter	

=== Codeshare and Interline Agreements ===
Drukair has codeshare and interline agreements with the following airlines:

=== Codeshare ===
- Hahn Air
- Nepal Airlines

=== Interline ===
- Turkish Airlines

== Fleet ==
=== Current fleet ===
As of November 2025, Drukair operates the following aircraft:

Drukair fleet
Aircraft	In service	Orders	Passengers			Notes	Registrations
Aircraft	In service	Orders	C	Y	Total	Notes	Registrations
Airbus A319-100	3	—	16	102	118		A5-JSW; A5-RGF; A5-RGG
Airbus A320neo	1	3	20	120	140	Deliveries from 2030.	A5-JKW
Airbus A321XLR	—	2	TBD			Deliveries from 2030.	
ATR 42-600	1	—	8	32	40		A5-JNW
PC-24	1	—	—	—	7		A5-JUW
Total	6	6					

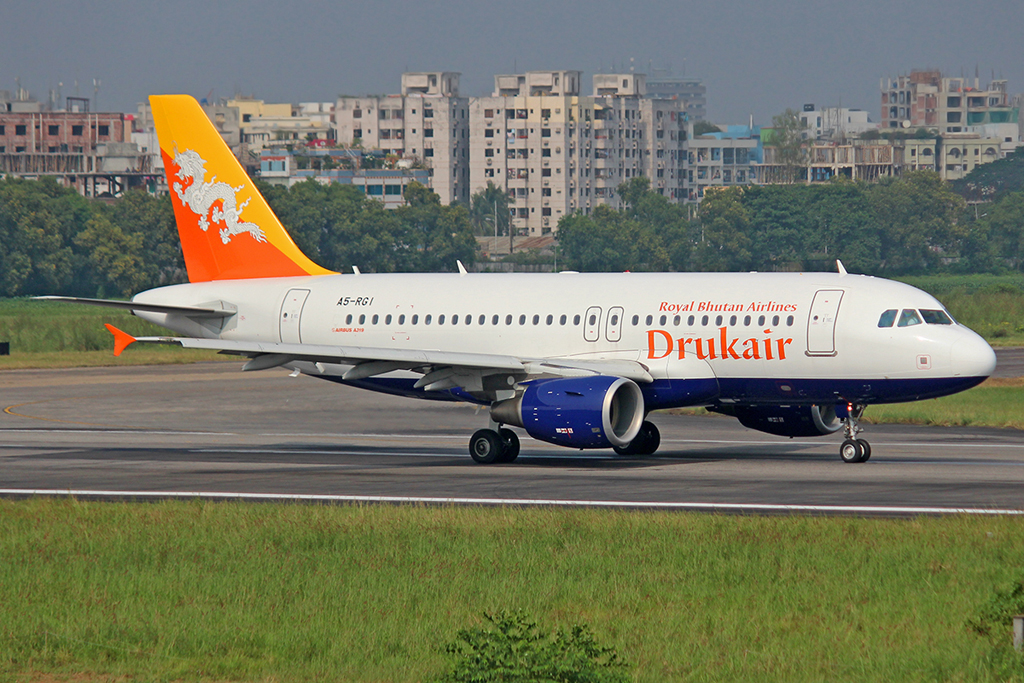
Drukair Airbus A319-115 at Shahjalal International Airport in Dhaka, Bangladesh

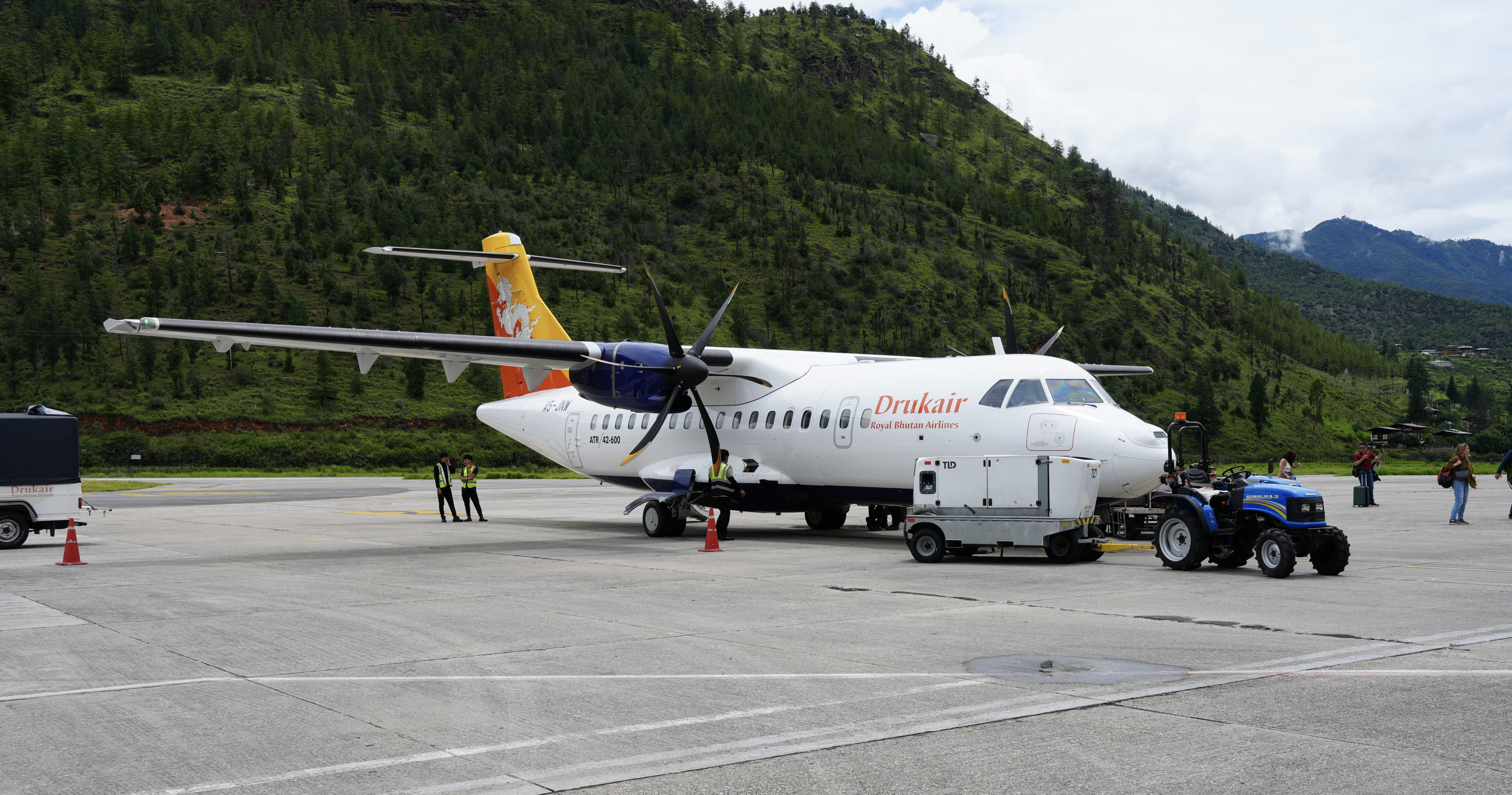
A Drukair ATR 42-600 at Paro International Airport

An ATR 42-500 first operated on a nine-month lease from April 2010 was evaluated by the airline with the possibility of a future purchase. On 4 June 2011, a purchased ATR 42-500 arrived in Paro. Drukair had bought the 48-seater with the view of using it to service the domestic routes to Bumthang and Yonphula in late 2011. On 22 October 2019, Drukair received a new ATR 42-600 following which it sold its ATR 42-500 to ATR.

On 12 October 2021, Drukair inaugurated its first Airbus A320neo. The aircraft was ordered in 2018 and received in April 2020.

=== Helicopter fleet ===
The Airbus H130 is the primary helicopter used for charter flights to remote villages. Royal Bhutan Helicopter Services, which previously operated the helicopter fleet, was merged with Druk Air to form Druk Air Helicopter Services.

The Druk Air helicopter services fleet consists of the following aircraft (as of December 2024):

Druk Air helicopter fleet
Aircraft	In service	Orders	Passengers	Purpose
Eurocopter EC130	3	0	7	Domestic charter
Total	3	0		

== Services ==
=== Frequent flyer program ===
"HapinessSmiles" formerly "My Happiness Reward" was launched by Drukair on 10 November 2014, to commemorate the birth anniversary of His Majesty the Fourth Druk Gyalpo Jigme Singye Wangchuck and to celebrate his philosophy of Gross National Happiness.

Program members can accumulate miles corresponding to the distance flown on Drukair and their class of service. Accrued miles may then be redeemed for free air tickets (Happiness Reward Ticket), upgrades at airports (Happiness Class Upgrade), and other benefits. Drukair currently offers 3 tiers of membership: Silver (Basic tier), Gold, and Platinum (the elite tier).

== Accidents and incidents ==
- On 16 April 2016, Druk Air Flight KB140 was damaged after flying through a hailstorm while on approach to Guwahati. The aircraft, an Airbus A319-115, operated on a flight from Paro to Bangkok via Guwahati. While descending to Guwahati over the Garo Hills, hailstones damaged and punctured the nose cone of the aircraft. A safe landing was made at Guwahati. No injuries were reported.
- On 3 March 2023, an EC130 with registration A5-BHT operated by Drukair Helicopter Services crashed near Wachey in Bhutan. Five people were on board, a family of four and a pilot. Two of the killed were a mother and her daughter.

== See also ==
- Transport in Bhutan
