= Department of Civil Aviation of Bhutan =

The Department of Civil Aviation (DCA) is a department of the Royal Government of Bhutan. The department is responsible for regulating aviation safety, airport regulation and providing air navigation services. It is subordinate to the Ministry of Information and Communications and has its head office in Paro.

The department is empowered to carry out its functions under the Kingdom of Bhutan Civil Aviation Act 2000.

== History ==
Aircraft have been operating in Bhutan since 1968. It was not until 1983 that Bhutan's national airline, Druk Air, established a unit to look after civil aviation matters.

In order to comply with international requirements to have an independent aviation safety authority, the Department of Civil Aviation was established in January 1986. As a newly established agency, the department sought assistance from the International Civil Aviation Organization and the United Nations Development Programme. These agencies provided assistance with staff training and organizational capacity building. Over time, the DCA's function has expanded; it is now responsible for the development and management of airports, the delivery of airport services and the provision of air navigation services.
