= Sports in Bhutan =

Sports in Bhutan comprise both traditional Bhutanese and modern international games. Archery is the national sport in Bhutan. Competitions are held regularly in most villages. Other traditional Bhutanese sports include khuru, soksom, pundo and digor.

International sports enjoy considerable popularity in modern Bhutan. Besides archery, many people in Bhutan play basketball. Other popular sports include football and futsal. Cricket has gained popularity in Bhutan, particularly since the introduction of television channels from India.

== Traditional sports ==
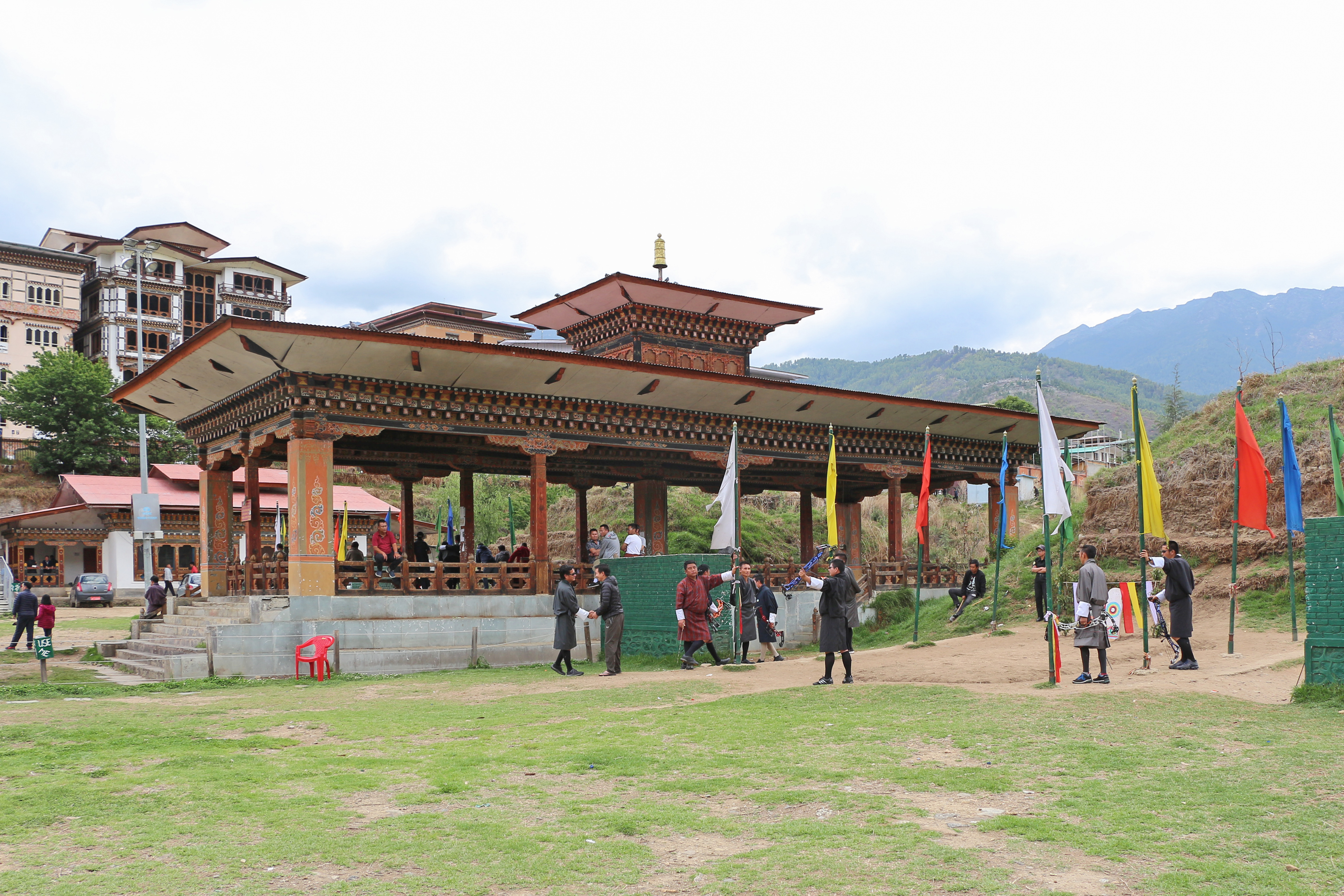
An archery competition in Thimphu.

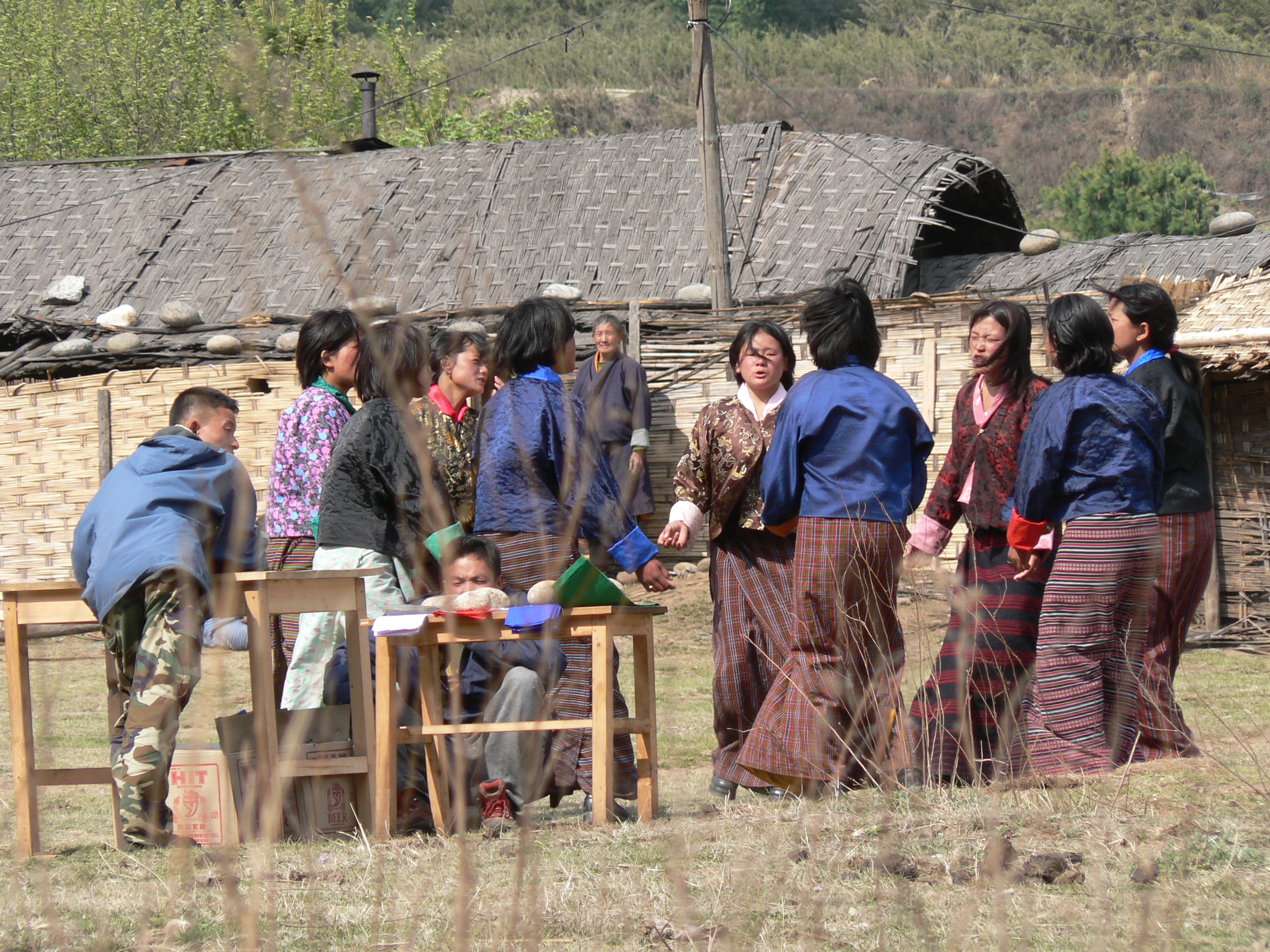
Archery cheerleading in Bhutan.

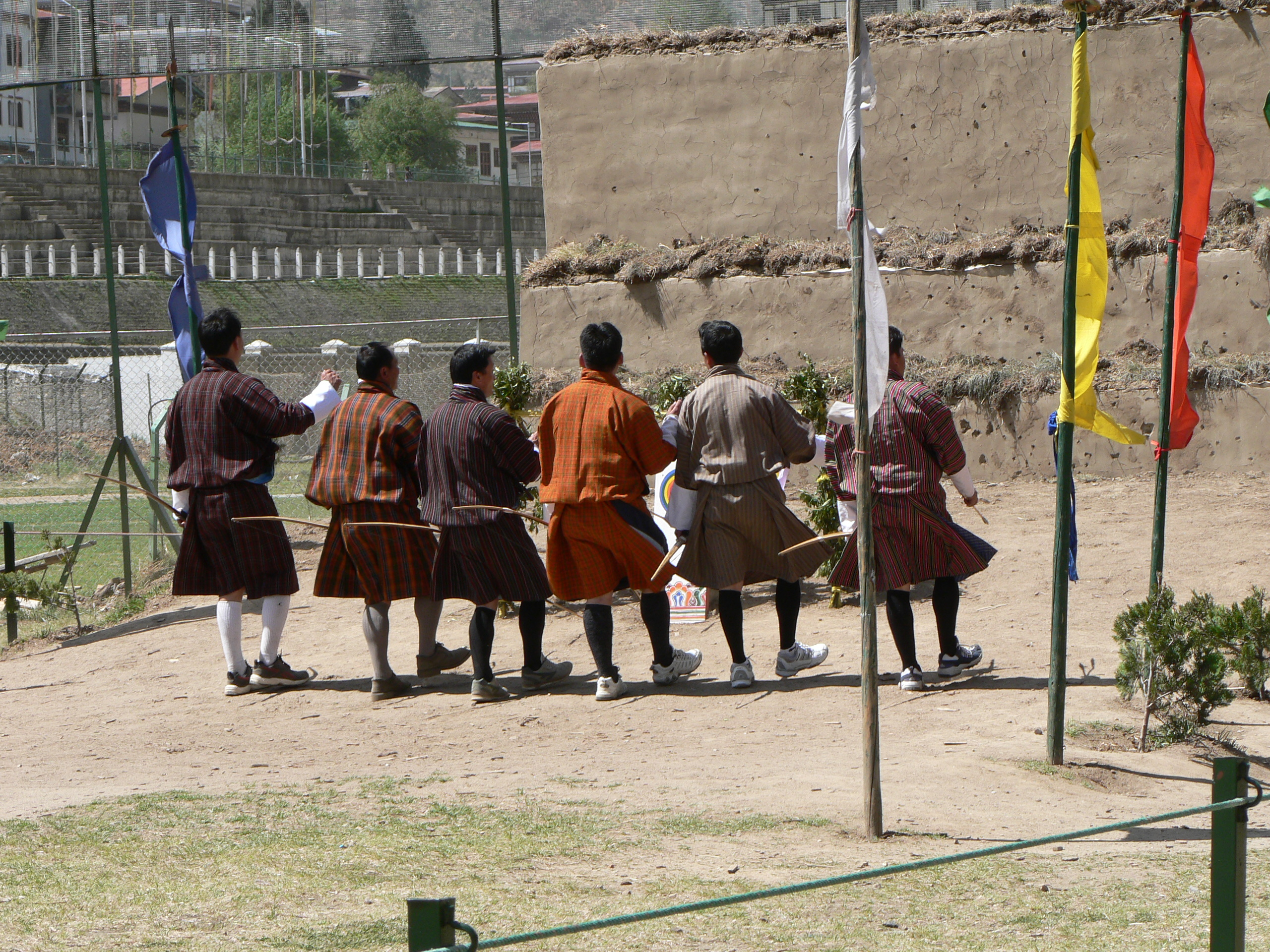
Archers dancing to celebrate a bullseye.

Traditional Bhutanese sports include archery first and foremost. Traditional archery has been historically prominent in Bhutanese religion, ritual, and recreation, and enjoys modern popularity and practice in tsechus (festivals) and matches. It differs from modern international archery in rules and metrics; players shoot at comparatively small targets at great distances. Bhutan also participates in modern international archery competitions, and maintains an Olympic archery team.

Khuru is an indigenous dart game, and like traditional archery, requires players to strike relatively small targets at long distances. It is played especially during festivals, along with soksom, akin to the javelin throw; and digor and pundo, akin to the shot put.

=== Archery ===
Archery is a national and most popular sport in Bhutan and is organized nationally within the Bhutan Archery Federation. Traditional Bhutanese archery differs from Olympic standards in technical details such as the placement of the targets and atmosphere. The distance to the target is about 130 metres (430 ft). The relatively small targets are cut from wood and brightly painted, usually measuring about 3 feet (91 cm) tall and 11 inches (28 cm) wide. Bullseyes are called karay. Traditionally, Bhutanese bows are made of bamboo, and arrows from bamboo or reeds, fletched with feather vanes. Arrows may be painted and tipped with metal arrowheads. The quiver may be wooden, with an animal hide covering and a woven strap.

Bhutanese archery teams number at 13 players; teams take turns shooting two arrows at a time first in one direction, then in the opposite direction. The first to score 25 points wins, however because the scoring system is complicated, winning can take a very long time. For example, a second hit by an opponent can invalidate the other player's score. In addition, the interplay of wider socializing and festivities, with archery as the nominal focus, give Bhutanese archery competitions an excruciatingly slow pace. In the past, the most traditional matches could last for as long as a month, though modern matches tend to span a number of days.

Traditional Bhutanese archery is a social event and competitions are organised between villages, towns, and amateur teams. There is usually plenty of food and drink complete with singing and dancing. Attempts to distract an opponent include standing around the target and making fun of the shooter's ability. The most notable archery competition in Bhutan is the Yangphel tournament. Other major archery competitions are held during Losar, the Bhutanese and Tibetan New Year.

Increasingly, Bhutanese archery has modernized even in traditional matches. Compound bows, corporate sponsorships, copious cash and material winnings, injuries, and occasional fatalities have become established features of archery. The popularity of archery has also raised questions of Bhutan's susceptibility to doping, including by alcohol, in the sport. It has also drawn attention to the danger in the sport, especially to spectators, residents, and passers by near archery ranges. Since 2010, Bhutan has held the Lyonchen Jigmi Y Thinley Archery Tournament, encouraging the use of traditional bows and the development of gewog teams.

=== Khuru ===
Khuru (darts) is a popular outdoor team sport often played during festivals and archery tournaments. When playing khuru, heavy wooden darts pointed with a 10 centimetres (3.9 in) nail are thrown at a paperback-sized target 10 metres (33 ft) to 20 metres (66 ft) away.

=== Soksom ===
Soksom, akin to the javelin throw, is a sport in which players throw a javelin a distance of 20 metres (66 ft).

=== Digor ===
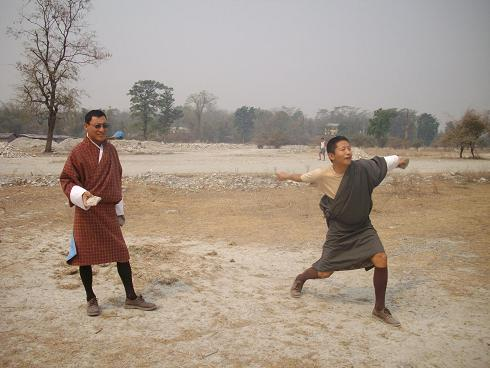
Bhutanese men playing digor.

Digor is a game resembling shot put, horseshoes, and pétanque. It is played with a pair of spherical flat stones that are hurled at two targets (pegs) fixed in the ground about 20 metres (66 ft) apart. It can be played one-on-one or in teams of up to seven players. Digor is played all over Bhutan, though most often by men in rural areas.

=== Pundo ===
Pundo is a traditional Bhutanese game most resembling shot put. It is played by throwing a stone weighing over a kilo as far as possible. The throwing movement is from the shoulder, with the stone held flat in the hand. It is usually played by laymen.

== International sports ==
Bhutan participates in modern international sports in three main areas. Archery, the national sport, is played internationally as well as domestically using modern equipment, and the kingdom maintains an Olympic archery team. Further, Bhutanese basketball, football and futsal teams compete at national, international, and Olympic levels. Cricket also enjoys a considerable following in Bhutan.

The Bhutan Olympic Committee was formed in 1983 and recognized by the IOC the same year. For each Summer Olympic Games since 1984, Bhutan has fielded male and female archers to compete in the kingdom's national sport. They have never competed in the Winter Olympic Games nor the other events of the Summer Olympic Games; they also have never won an Olympic Medal. Bhutan sent only one athlete to the 2010 Summer Youth Olympics but lost in the quarterfinals of the athletics event.

=== Football ===
The sport of football in Bhutan is run by the Bhutan Football Federation. The association administers the Bhutan national football team as well as the A-Division.

In 2002, Bhutan's national football team played Montserrat, in what was billed as The Other Final; the match took place on the same day Brazil and Germany in the World Cup Final, but at the time Bhutan and Montserrat were the world's 2 lowest ranked teams. The match was held in Thimphu's Changlimithang national stadium, and Bhutan won 4–0.

=== Cricket ===
The Bhutan national cricket team represents the kingdom in international cricket matches and is one of the most successful affiliate nations in the region. Bhutan became an affiliate member of the ICC in 2001. They made their international debut at the 2004 ACC Trophy, where they made the quarter-finals. They again competed at the ACC Trophy in 2006 but were eliminated in the first round after a series of heavy defeats. Their only win came against newcomers Myanmar.

Following the 2006 ACC Trophy, the tournament was split into two divisions, Elite and Challenge. Bhutan took part in the 2009 ACC Trophy Challenge, where they were runners up. This result qualified them for the next ACC Trophy Elite as well as Division eight of the World Cricket League.

The Bhutan women's national cricket team made its international debut at the 2009 ACC Women's Twenty20 Championship. It has played regularly since then.

=== Basketball ===
The Bhutan Basketball Federation joined the international basketball federation FIBA in 1983. Its national team has played many qualification games for the FIBA Asia Championship but still waits for its breakthrough.

=== Futsal ===
The Bhutan national futsal team represents Bhutan in international futsal competitions and is controlled by the Bhutan Football Federation.

=== Baseball ===
As of 2023, baseball is the fastest growing sport in Bhutan. The Bhutan Baseball and Softball Association reports that more than 6,000 children consistently play baseball.

=== Kho kho ===
Bhutan was introduced to kho kho, a traditional game of India, in 2019, and participated in the inaugural 2025 Kho Kho World Cup in India.

== Venues ==
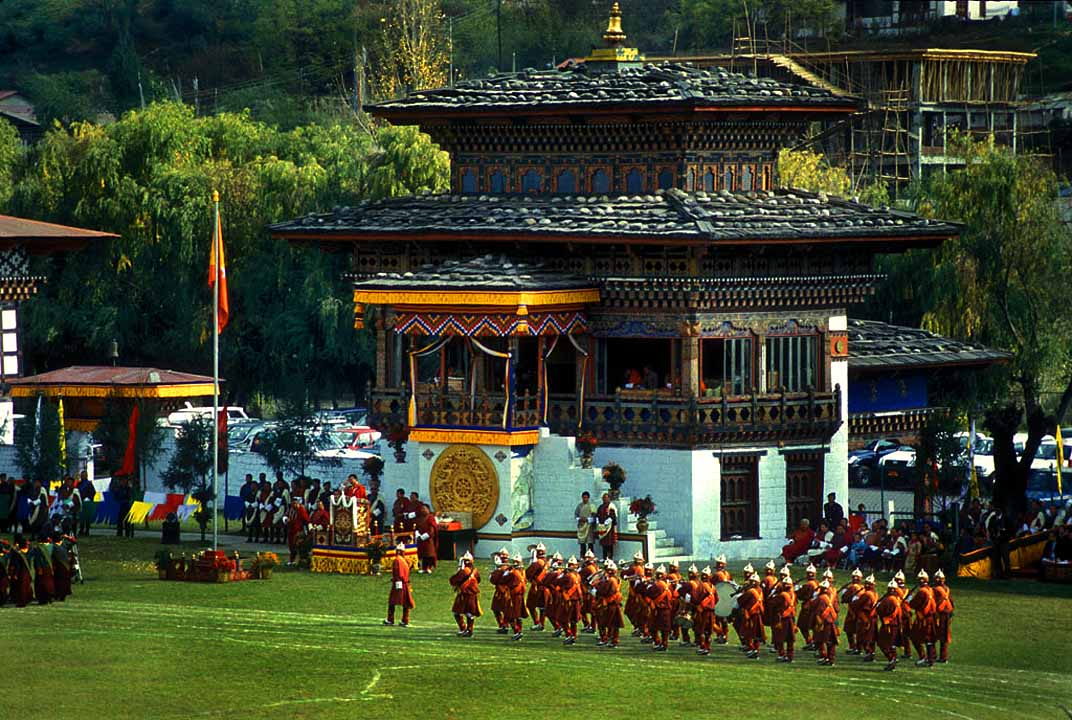
Changlimithang Stadium, during a parade

Changlimithang Stadium in Thimphu is the main venue for major sporting events in Bhutan, including archery and football. With a capacity of 25,000, the stadium has also hosted theatrical performances and celebrations as part of national holidays and major events such as the royal wedding in 2011.

As archery is especially popular, every village has a field for the sport.

== See also ==
- Bhutan at the Asian Games
- Bhutan at the Olympics
- Culture of Bhutan
