= National symbols of Bhutan =

The National Symbols of Bhutan include the national flag, national emblem, national anthem, and the mythical druk thunder featured in all three. Other distinctive symbols of Bhutan and its dominant Ngalop culture include Dzongkha, the national language; the Bhutanese monarchy; and the Driglam Namzha, a seventeenth-century code on dress, etiquette, and dzong architecture. Natural symbols of Bhutan are its national flower, the Himalayan blue poppy; its national tree, the Himalayan cypress; its national bird, the raven; and its national animal, the takin.

These national symbols are established variously by law and tradition. While most laws codifying the national symbols of Bhutan such as the flag, emblem, and national anthem are modern, the tradition behind many of them is much older than the kingdom itself, deriving from Buddhist mythology. The druk thunder dragon is heavily associated with the Bhutanese state religion and has symbolized Bhutan ("Druk-yul") in particular since the late twelfth century. Traditional natural symbols, such as the raven and Himalayan cypress, possess not only admired characteristics, but religious meanings as well.

== Flag of Bhutan ==
The flag of Bhutan is based upon the tradition of the Drukpa Lineage of Tibetan Buddhism and features Druk, the Thunder Dragon of Bhutanese mythology. The basic design of the flag by Mayum Choying Wangmo Dorji dates to 1947. A version was displayed in 1949 at the signing of the Indo-Bhutan Treaty. A second version was introduced in 1956 for the visit of Druk Gyalpo Jigme Dorji Wangchuk to eastern Bhutan; it was based upon photos of its 1949 predecessor and featured a white Druk in place of the green original.

The flag of Bhutan featuring the Druk holding sacred jewels, mouth agape

The Bhutanese subsequently redesigned their flag to match the measurements of the flag of India, which they believed fluttered better than their own. Other modifications such as changing the red background color to orange led to the current national flag, in use since 1969. The National Assembly of Bhutan codified a code of conduct in 1972 to formalize the flag's design establish protocol regarding acceptable flag sizes and conditions for flying the flag.

The First Schedule of the Constitution of 2008 legally describes the flag:

The upper yellow half that touches the base symbolizes the secular tradition. It personifies His Majesty the King, whose noble actions enhance the Kingdom. Hence, it symbolizes that His Majesty is the upholder of the spiritual and secular foundations of the Kingdom. The lower orange half that extends to the top symbolizes the spiritual tradition. It also symbolizes the flourishing of the Buddhist teachings in general and that of the Kagyu and Nyingma traditions in particular. The dragon that fully presses down the fimbriation symbolizes the name of the Kingdom, which is endowed with the spiritual and secular traditions... The white dragon symbolizes the undefiled thoughts of the people that express their loyalty, patriotism and great sense of belonging to the Kingdom although they have different ethnic and linguistic origins.

The official description of the symbolism behind the flag remains largely the same as it was when first codified under the Act of 1972.

== Emblem of Bhutan ==
The emblem of Bhutan featuring a dorje above a lotus, surmounted by a jewel, and framed by two druk.

The emblem of Bhutan is used in official government publications such as legislation and websites. The emblem was first legally codified as a national symbol in the Constitution in 2008. As such, it is a relatively new addition to the list of national symbols of Bhutan. Nonetheless, like the national flag, the national emblem is rich in Buddhist iconography whose symbolism has had great meaning to the people of Bhutan for centuries. Prior to its codification, the emblem appeared in Bhutanese legislation and websites of the Bhutanese government pre-dating the enactment of the Constitution.

The Constitution provides this description of the circular emblem of Bhutan:

Within the circle of the national emblem, two crossed vajras are placed over a lotus. They are flanked on either side by a male and female white dragon. A wish-fulfilling jewel is located above them. There are four other jewels inside the circle where the two vajras intersect. They symbolize the spiritual and secular traditions of the Kingdom based on the four spiritual undertakings of Vajrayana Buddhism. The lotus symbolizes absence of defilements; the wish-fulfilling jewel, the sovereign power of the people; and the two dragons, the name of the Kingdom.

Some features of the emblem may vary; for example, the background may appear as crimson, blue, or black. The emblem of Bhutan is also used as the logo of some government agencies, for example, the Bhutan Trust Fund.

== National Anthem of Bhutan ==
The Druk Tsendhen ("The Thunder Dragon Kingdom") is the national anthem of Bhutan. Adopted in 1953, the music was composed by Aku Tongmi and the words were penned by Dasho Gyaldun Thinley. Tongmi was educated in India and had recently been appointed leader of the military brass band when the need for an anthem rose at the occasion of a state visit from Prime Minister Nehru of India. The original score was inspired by the Bhutanese folk tune "The Unchanging Lotus Throne" (Thri nyampa med pa pemai thri).

The melody has twice undergone changes by Mr. Tongmi's successors as band leaders. The original lyrics had twelve lines, but the anthem was later shortened to the present six-line version in 1964 by a secretary to the Druk Gyalpo (Bhutanese Head of State). The lyrics appear in the Second Schedule of the democratically enacted Constitution of 2008. As the anthem is inspired by a folk tune, there is a choreography to it as well, originally directed by Mr. Tongmi.

== Bhutanese society ==
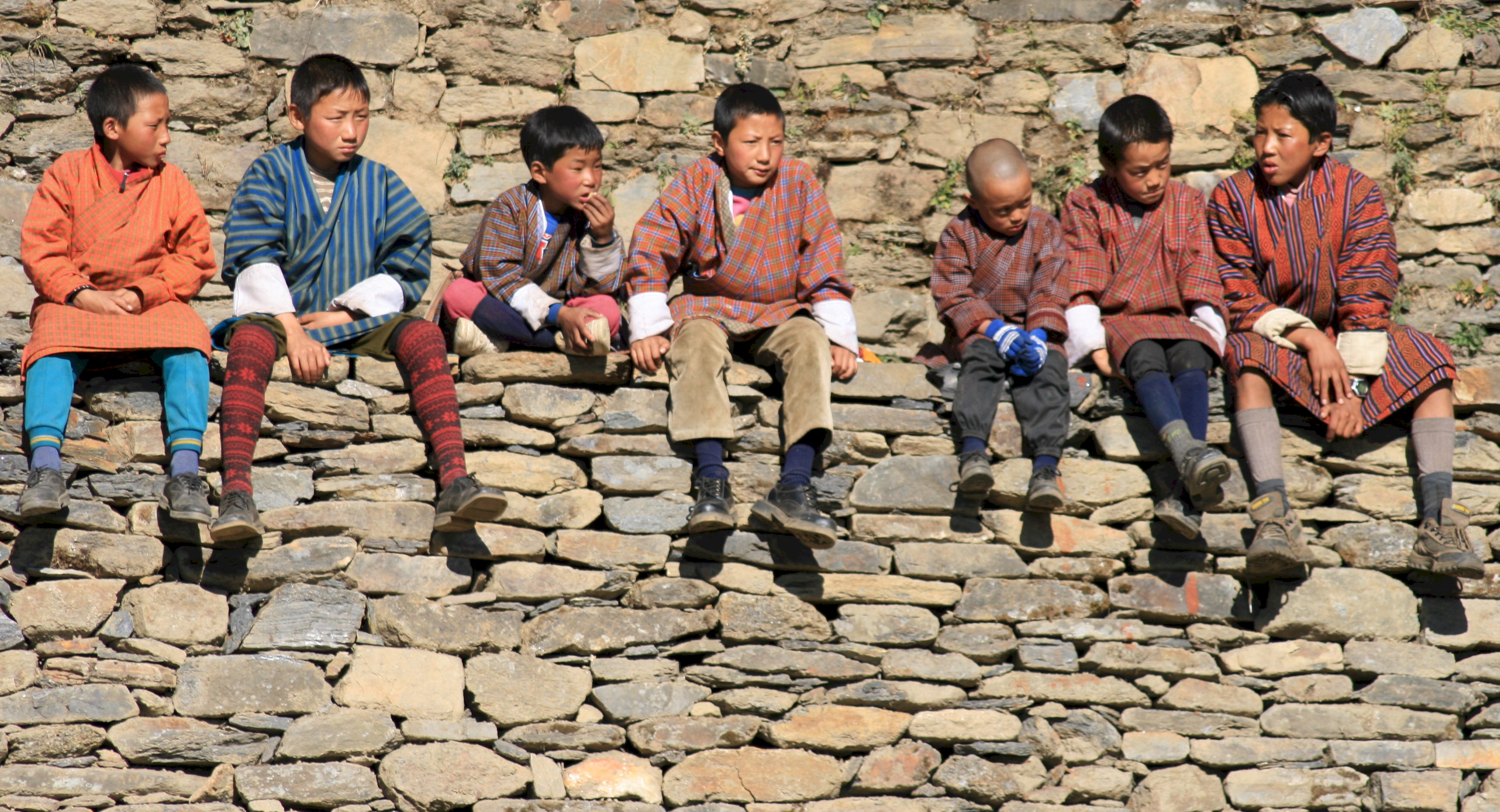
Boys at a festival wear the gho.

Other notable symbols of Bhutanese culture and national identity are the distinctive Bhutanese dress, the Bhutanese monarchy, and Dzongkha, the national language.

The driglam namzha, a seventeenth-century code on dress, etiquette, and architecture, mandates wearing Ngalop clothing, the gho and kira, in public. The code, while distinctive and symbolic of Bhutanese identity, is resented by many non-Ngalop Lhotshampa.

The Ngalop Bhutanese monarchy itself, and especially the reigning Druk Gyalpo, are prominent symbols of Bhutan. The kingdom, which began in 1907 as an absolute monarchy, has endeavored on a path of modernization and democratization largely at the behest of its latest three kings. The democratic Constitution of 2008 explicitly enshrines the institution of the monarchy and the line of Ugyen Wangchuck. The Constitution and modern laws also preserve the monarch's active role in reviewing and assenting to laws, hearing judicial appeals, and guiding domestic and foreign policy.

One prominent symbol of the Bhutanese monarchy is the Raven Crown, worn by reigning monarchs since the reign of Ugyen Wangchuck (1907–1926). The first King of Bhutan Ugyen Wangchuck adopted as the unique symbol of his authority a crown surmounted by the head of a raven. The bird represents a form of Mahakala, Bhutan's guardian deity. The prototype of the founding monarch's Raven Crown had first been devised as a battle helmet for his father, Jigme Namgyel (1825–81). Known as the Black Regent, he had worn it in bloody struggles against his many rivals within the country and against the British who tried, unsuccessfully, to subdue him.

The national language, Dzongkha, is a symbol of the state of Bhutan and is its legally designated lingua franca among the many languages of Bhutan. Like the driglam namzha and Bhutanese monarchy, Dzongkha is also a salient feature of Ngalop culture in particular. The name of the language hearkens to the distinctive dzong fortresses, now used as government centers.

== National Flower ==
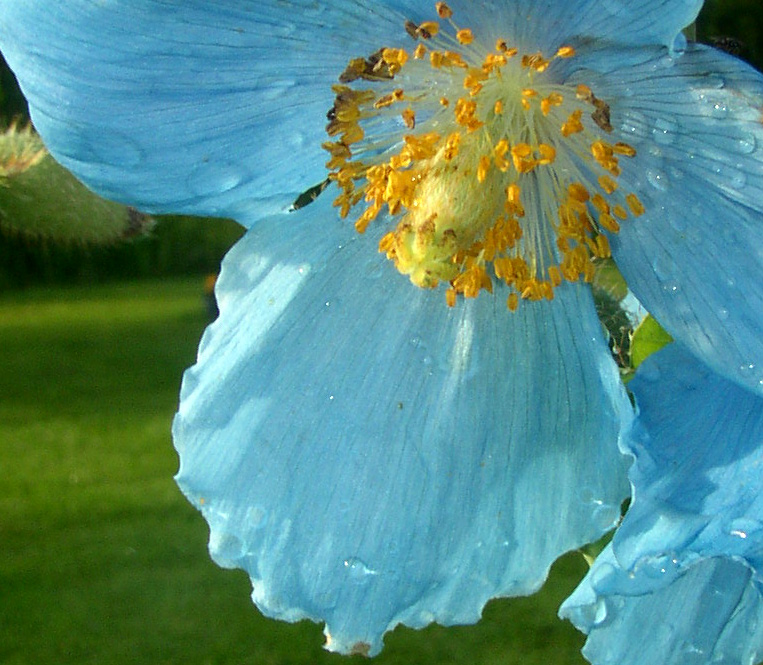
The Himalayan blue poppy is the national flower of Bhutan.

The national flower of Bhutan is the Himalayan blue poppy (Meconopsis gakyidiana). In Bhutan, it grows to a height of 1 meter on the rocky mountain terrain, above the tree line at altitudes of 3500m to 4500m. Bhutanese tradition links this flower with the yeti of lore. The flower was discovered in 1933 by British botanist George Sherriff in remote part of Sakteng in eastern Bhutan.

== National Tree ==
The Himalayan cypress (Cupressus torolusa) is the national tree of Bhutan. They are associated with religion, and may often be found near the religious structures and in the temperate zone between altitudes of 1800m and 3500m. To the Bhutanese, its ability to survive on rugged terrain represents bravery and simplicity.

== National Bird ==
The national bird is the raven. As noted above, it is the most prominent component of the royal crown. In Bhutan, the raven represents the deity Gonpo Jarodongchen, the raven-headed Mahakala, one of the country's chief guardian deities. The Bhutanese credit the raven with having guided the founder of Bhutan, Shabdrung Ngawang Namgyal, to victory during the invasion from Ü-Tsang (Tibet) in the seventeenth century.

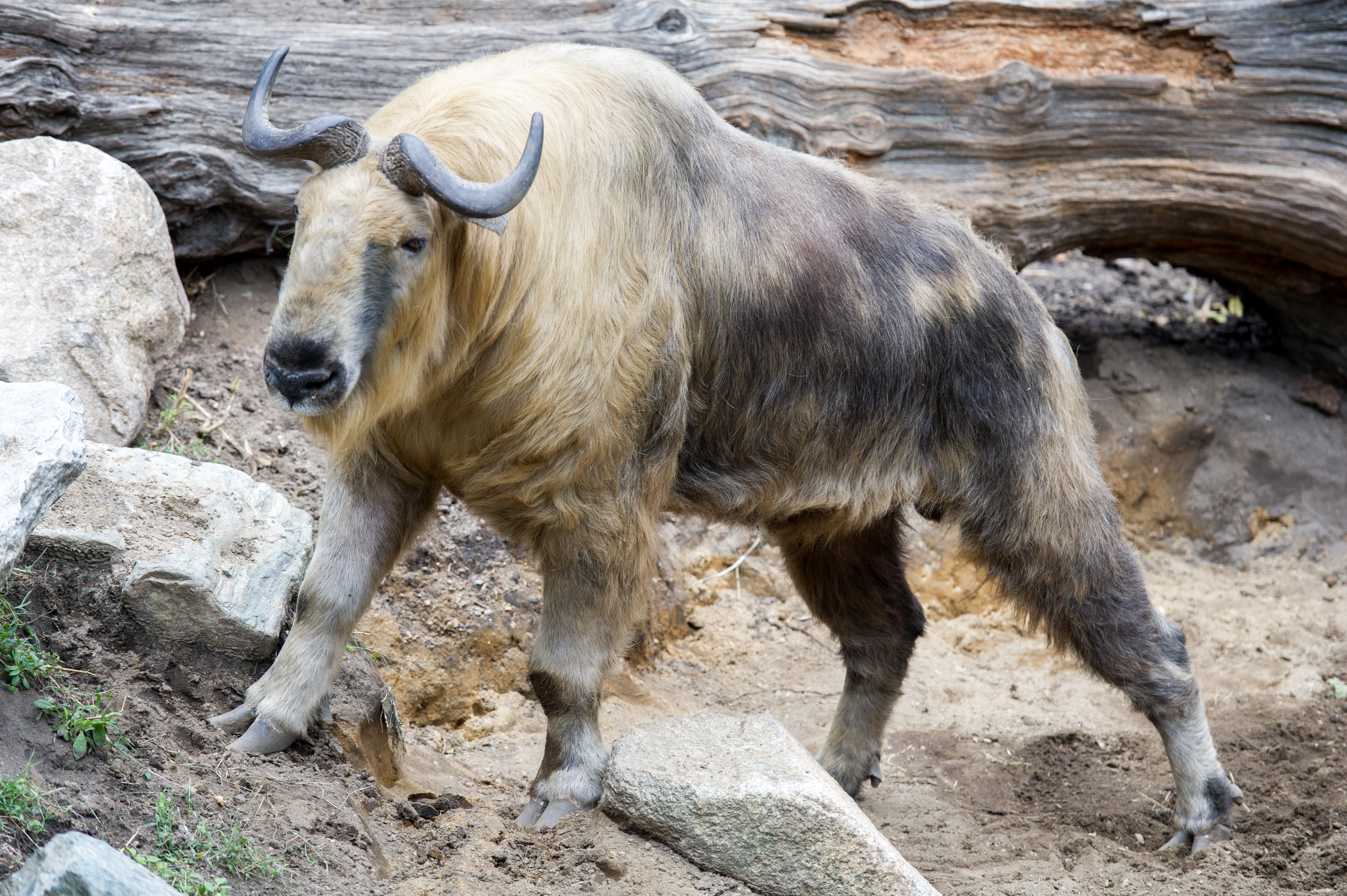
The Takin is the national animal of Bhutan.

== National Animal ==
The national animal is the takin (Burdorcas taxicolor). This bovid is also associated with religious history and mythology. Today it is a rare animal, and its conservation status is "vulnerable." It has a thick neck and short muscular legs. It lives on bamboo, traveling in groups at elevations around 4000m on the northwestern and far northeastern parts of Bhutan.

=== Druk tradition ===
The druk (Dzongkha: འབྲུག་; Wylie: 'brug), or "thunder dragon" of Bhutanese mythology, has been the national symbol of Bhutan since long before the establishment of government in 1907. Since the seventeenth century, Bhutan's self-designation has been Drukyul ("Land of the Thunder Dragon"), or Dru-gäkhap ("Kingdom of the Thunder Dragon"). The Druk is heavily associated with the dominant Drukpa sect of Buddhism, the state religion under Bhutan's dual system of government. This sect was founded in western Tibet by Drogon Tsangpa Gyare Yeshe Dorje (1161–1211), who with his disciples witnessed nine dragons roaring out of the earth and into the skies, as flowers rained down everywhere. From this incident they named their sect Drukpa. The Druk thus features prominently in other national symbols by tradition, and — since the establishment of the Wangchuck dynasty — by law.

== Sport ==
Archery has been the official national sport of Bhutan since the kingdom's accession to the United Nations in 1971. Other particularly Bhutanese sports of note include digor, resembling shot put, and khuru, a kind of outdoor dart game. These sports have their own tournaments and place in celebrations ranging from local tsechu festivals to Bhutanese public holidays. These traditional sports, especially archery, are imbued with communal, religious, material, and commercial significance. Increasingly, traditional sports have adopted modern innovations, from compound bows to corporate sponsorship.

== Law ==
The most recent laws regarding the national symbols of Bhutan are enumerated in the national constitution of 2008. The Constitution represents the only democratically enacted legislation regarding Bhutan's national symbols. Foremost, the Constitution confirmed the status of Dzongkha as the national language and set December 17 – the day of the founding of the monarchy – as the National Day. It also confirms the Drukpa Kagyu school of Mahayana Buddhism as the state religion. The First Schedule of the Constitution sets forth the latest legal description of the national flag and emblem, while its Second Schedule reproduces the lyrics of the Bhutanese national anthem.

Prior to 2008, other laws regarding the Bhutanese flag and flag etiquette existed; they continue in effect where they are not inconsistent with later law. One such law is the National Flag Rules of Bhutan, enacted in 1972. The Act described the symbolism behind the flag in terms nearly identical to those used in the Constitution decades later. In addition, the Act provides several rules on flag etiquette, especially hoisting and displaying the flag.

== See also ==
- Emblem of Bhutan
- Flag of Bhutan
- Druk tsendhen
- Druk
