= Dragon flag =

Dragon flag may refer to:

Flag of Bhutan

Flag of the Qing dynasty

Flag of Wales

- a flag featuring a dragon, including:
  - Flag of Bhutan
  - Flag of the Qing dynasty
  - Flag of Wales
- a type of crunch (exercise)

== See also ==
- List of flags by design § Animal, which includes flags with dragons
- Media related to Flags with animals#Dragon at Wikimedia Commons
