= Drukyul (disambiguation) =

Drukyul or Druk Yul or variation, may refer to:

- Bhutan, an endonym meaning The Land of the Thunder Dragon in Bhutanese (Dzongkha: Drukyul)
  - Drukyul, a historic name for Bhutan, see History of Bhutan
  - Druk Yul, the Land of the Druk, the traditional lands of the Druk
  - Druk Yul, the traditional territory ruled by the Druk Gyalpo
- HD 73534 b (planet), Star Gakyid, Constellation Cancer; an exoplanet named for Bhutan

== See also ==
- Druk (disambiguation)
- Yul (disambiguation)
- The Senkaku Islands dispute, also known as the Diaoyu Islands
