= Digor =

Digor may refer to:

- Digor (sports), a traditional sport in Bhutan
- Digor dialect, a dialect of the Ossetian language
- Digor, Kars, a district in Turkey's Kars Province
- Digor (people), a sub-division of the Ossetians.
