= Dragon Country =

Dragon Country may refer to:

- Dragon Country, an anthology of plays by Tennessee Williams
- Four Asian Tigers, also known as 'Four Asian Dragons', the economies of South Korea, Taiwan, Singapore and Hong Kong
- Bhutan (Dzongkha: འབྲུག་ཡུལ་, romanized: Druk Yul), sometimes translated as Dragon Country; see Flag of Bhutan
