= Druk (disambiguation) =

Druk (Dzongkha: འབྲུག་) is the legendary Thunder Dragon of Bhutan.

Druk may also refer to:

== Bhutan ==
- Druk, or Drukpa, of or pertaining to Bhutan

- of or pertaining to the Ngalop people, the majority ethnicity in Bhutan

- Druk Gyalpo "Thunder Dragon King", the formal title of the King of Bhutan
- Drukyul, the Dzongkha name for Bhutan, translates to Land of the Thunder Dragon
- Druk tsendhen, the national anthem of Bhutan
- Druk Air, the national airline of Bhutan
- Druk Phuensum Tshogpa, the Bhutan Peace and Prosperity Party
- Drukpa Kagyu, an independent branch of the Kagyu school of Tibetan Buddhism and the state religion of Bhutan
  - Gyalwang Drukpa, the honorific title of the head of the Drukpa Lineage

== Other uses ==
- Druk or druk bead, a kind of small round Bohemian glass bead
- Disability Rights UK, a British charity

== See also ==
- Another Round (Danish: Druk), a 2020 Scandinavian black comedy-drama film
- Druks (disambiguation)
