= List of Bhutanese flags =

This is a list of flags used in Bhutan. For more information about the national flag, see flag of Bhutan.

== National flag ==
Flag	Date	Use	Description
	1969–present	Flag of Bhutan	Divided diagonally from the lower hoist-side corner to the upper fly-side corner; the upper triangle is yellow and the lower triangle is orange, with a white dragon holding four jewels in its claws centered along the dividing line and facing away from the hoist.
	1969–present	Flag of Bhutan (vertical)	
	1969–present	Flag of Bhutan (variant)	

== Military flags ==
Flag	Date	Use	Description
	1958–present	Flag of the Royal Bhutan Army	A horizontal tricolour of white, black, and red with the Bhutanese flag in the canton and defaced with a Kartika.
	1958–present	Flag of the Royal Bodyguard of Bhutan	Divided diagonally from the lower hoist-side corner to the upper fly-side corner; the upper triangle is yellow and the lower triangle is red, with a Dharmachakra centered along the dividing line.

== Police flags ==
Flag	Date	Use	Description
	19??–present	Flag of the Royal Bhutan Police	
	19??–present	Flag of the Royal Bhutan Police (variant)	

== Political flags ==
Flag	Date	Party	Description
	2003–present	Communist Party of Bhutan	
	1990–present	Bhutan Peoples' Party	
	1994–present	Druk National Congress	

== Historical flags ==
Flag	Date	Use	Description
	1271–1354	Battle flag of the Yuan dynasty	
	1271–1354	Battle flag of the Yuan dynasty	
	1271–1354	Battle flag of the Yuan dynasty	
	1616–1774	Banners of Bhutan	
	1949	First flag of Bhutan	Divided diagonally from the lower hoist-side corner to the upper fly-side corner; the upper triangle is yellow and the lower triangle is red, with a green dragon holding jewels in its claws. The design of the flag is credited to Mayeum Choying Wongmo Dorji in 1947.

From 1949 to 1969 a variety of changes were made to individual flags leading toward the current design, but no particular flag is well-attested, and no official design appears to have been adopted until the present flag was established in 1969.

== See also ==
- Flag of Bhutan
- Emblem of Bhutan
