= Druks (disambiguation) =

Druks may refer to:

== Surname ==
- Michael Druks (1940–2022), Israeli-born British artist
- Renate Druks (1921–2007), American painter and filmmaker

== Others ==
- Druks or druk beads, small round Bohemian glass beads

== See also ==
- Druk
