= Khuru (sport) =

Bhutanese dart sport

Khuru (Dzongkha: ཁུ་རུ་; Wylie: khu-ru) is a traditional Bhutanese dart sport. Unlike archery, khuru is simple and affordable, requiring no more than a pair of darts and a target. Khuru is played on holidays and other special events all around the nation and is just as popular as archery.

The distance between two targets is 35 metres (115 ft) for men and 27 metres (89 ft) for women, according to the Bhutan Indigenous Games and Sports Association. A cultural shift in Bhutan has led to the participation of women in khuru tournaments.

== Rules ==
The Bhutan Indigenous Games and Sports Association (BIGSA) was established with the goal of promoting traditional Bhutanese games and sports. The organization has a web page for the rules of khuru, but as of 2025 that page is empty.

== See also ==
- Archery in Bhutan
- Sports in Bhutan
