= Archery in Bhutan =

National sport of Bhutan

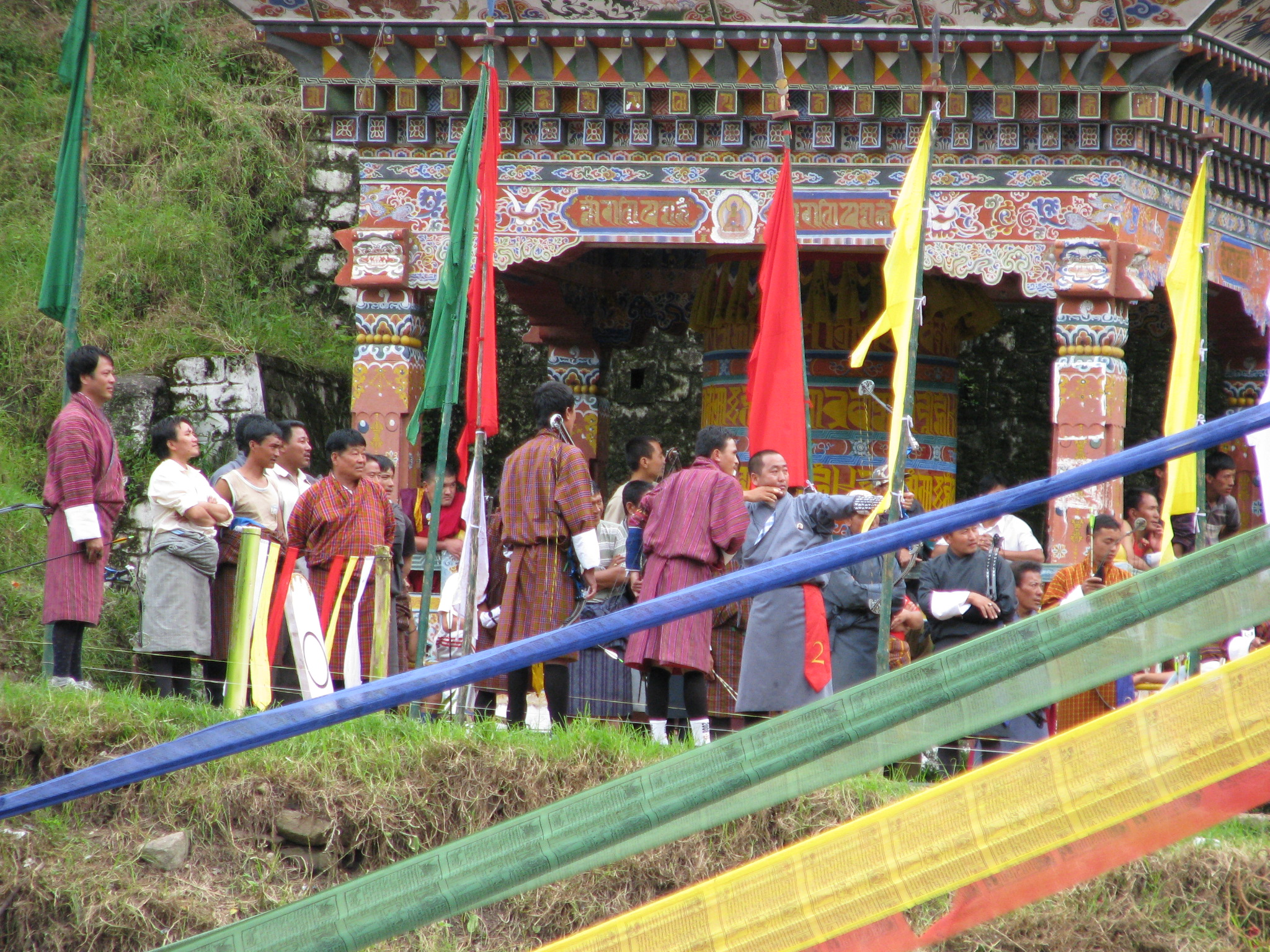
Archery competition

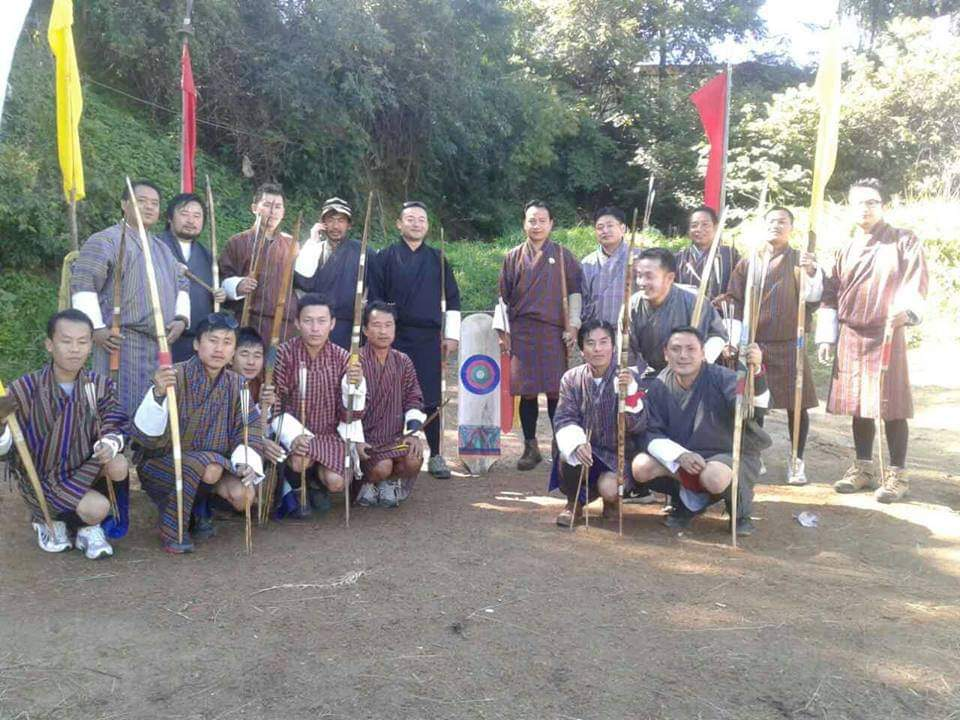
Traditional Archery in Bhutan

Archery in Bhutan (Dzongkha: མདའ་ (da); Wylie: daa; 'arrow,' 'archery') is the national sport of the Kingdom. Archery was declared the national sport in 1971, when Bhutan became a member of the United Nations. Since then, the popularity of Bhutanese archery has increased both inside and outside Bhutan, with a measure of government promotion. Bhutan also maintains an Olympic archery group.

Archery is played during religious and secular public holidays in Bhutan, local festivals (tsechu), between public ministries and departments, and between the local, dzonkhag, and regional teams. Archery tournaments and performances have also become a significant point of interest for tourism in Bhutan.

Archery in Bhutan is culturally distinctive because it is a martial art practiced among a modern population that abhors killing. Bhutanese people from different social strata find archery one of the most enjoyable sports, being both fun and physical exercise. In addition, archery builds concentration, which contributes to mental development; according to a Bhutanese proverb, both sailing and archery require intelligence. Archery in Bhutan is a way of socialization, communication, and development of relations between people. Emotions run high during competitions, and support for archers and ridicule or distraction of opponents can become as violent as in other countries' sporting events.

== Archery competitions ==
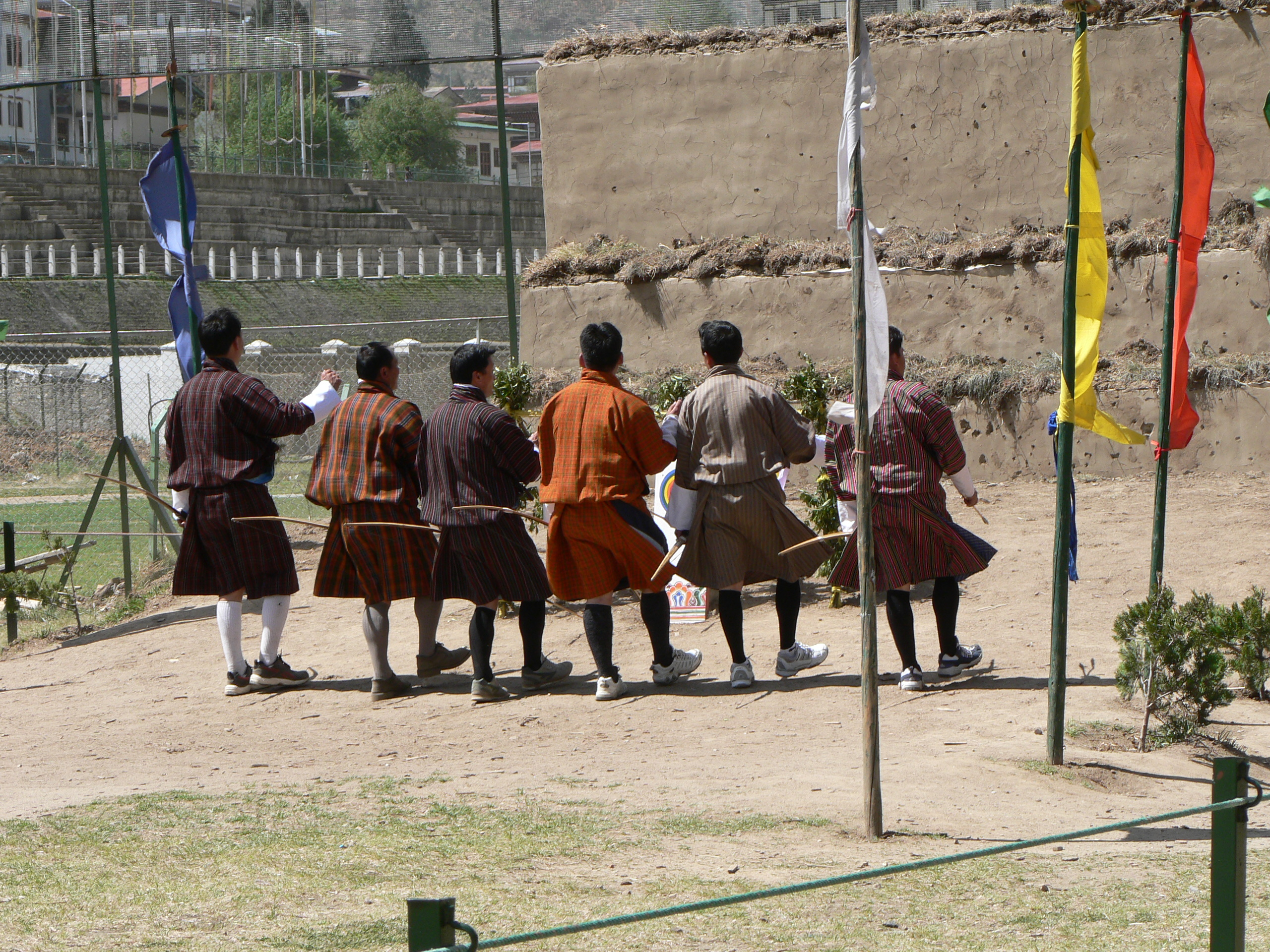
Archers dancing to celebrate a bullseye

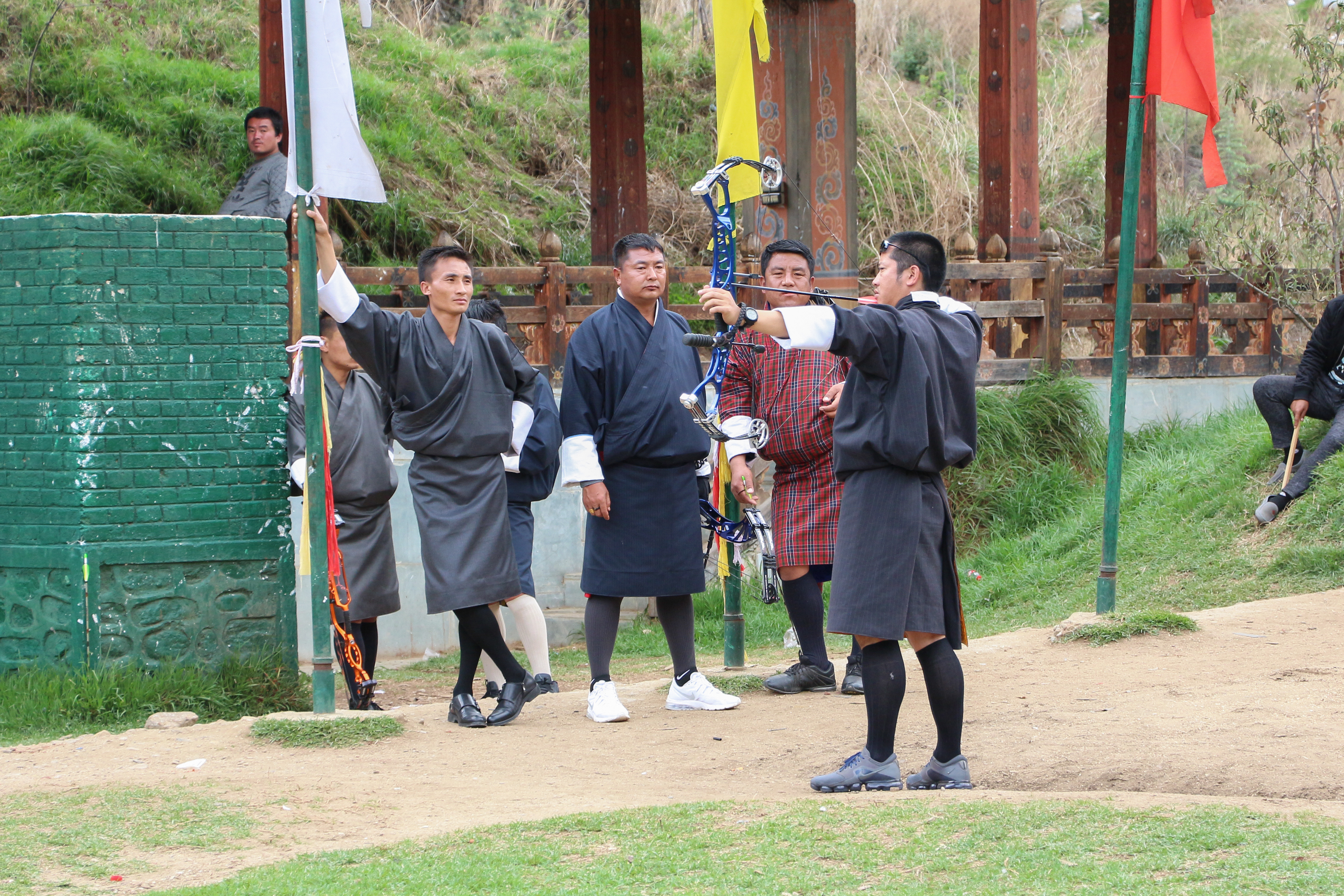
Archery competition in Thimphu

Every village has a field for archery; Changlimithang Stadium in Thimphu is one of the kingdom's most prominent archery fields. The most notable archery competition in Bhutan are Coronation National Archery tournament and Yangphel tournament. Other major archery competitions are held during Losar, the Bhutanese and Tibetan New Year.

The distance to the target is about 145 metres (476 ft). The relatively small targets are cut from wood and brightly painted, usually measuring about 3 feet (91 cm) tall and 11 inches (28 cm) wide. Bullseyes are called karay. Traditionally, Bhutanese bows are made of bamboo, and arrows from bamboo or reeds, fletched with feather vanes. Arrows may be painted and tipped with metal arrowheads. Quivers may be wooden, with an animal hide covering and a woven strap.

Bhutanese archery teams number at 13 players; teams take turns shooting two arrows at a time first in one direction, then in the opposite direction. The first to score 25 points wins, however because the scoring system is complicated, winning can take a very long time. For example, a second hit by an opponent can invalidate the other player's score. In addition, the interplay of wider socializing and festivities, with archery as the nominal focus, gives Bhutanese archery competitions an excruciatingly slow pace. In the past, the most traditional matches could last for as long as a month, though modern matches tend to span a number of days.

Preparations for archery matches are different from other sports: competitors are advised not to spend the night with their wives the night before the competition in order to achieve a high level of concentration. On the eve of a competition, the team spends the night in the woods or in a barn. Opening events precede the initiation and breakfast, and alcoholic beverages can be consumed on the morning of competitions. Teams often employ astrologers to select competing members. In their prognostications, astrologers use puppets (tsip) to symbolize archers, puppets of fate who have no control of their destiny. These astrologers are often hired at substantial fees in archers' attempts to have favorable tsip performances, cast curses against other archers, and gain an upper hand. Astrologers also calculate the time and place for competition.

Modern archery competitions feature compound bows, corporate sponsorships, copious cash and material winnings, injuries, and occasional fatalities. The popularity of archery has raised questions of Bhutan's susceptibility to doping, including by alcohol, in the sport. The increased modern popularity of archery has also drawn attention to the danger in the sport, especially to spectators, residents, and passers by near archery ranges. Since 2010, Bhutan has held the Lyonchen Jigmi Y Thinley Archery Tournament, encouraging the use of traditional bows and the development of gewog teams.

== Women in archery ==
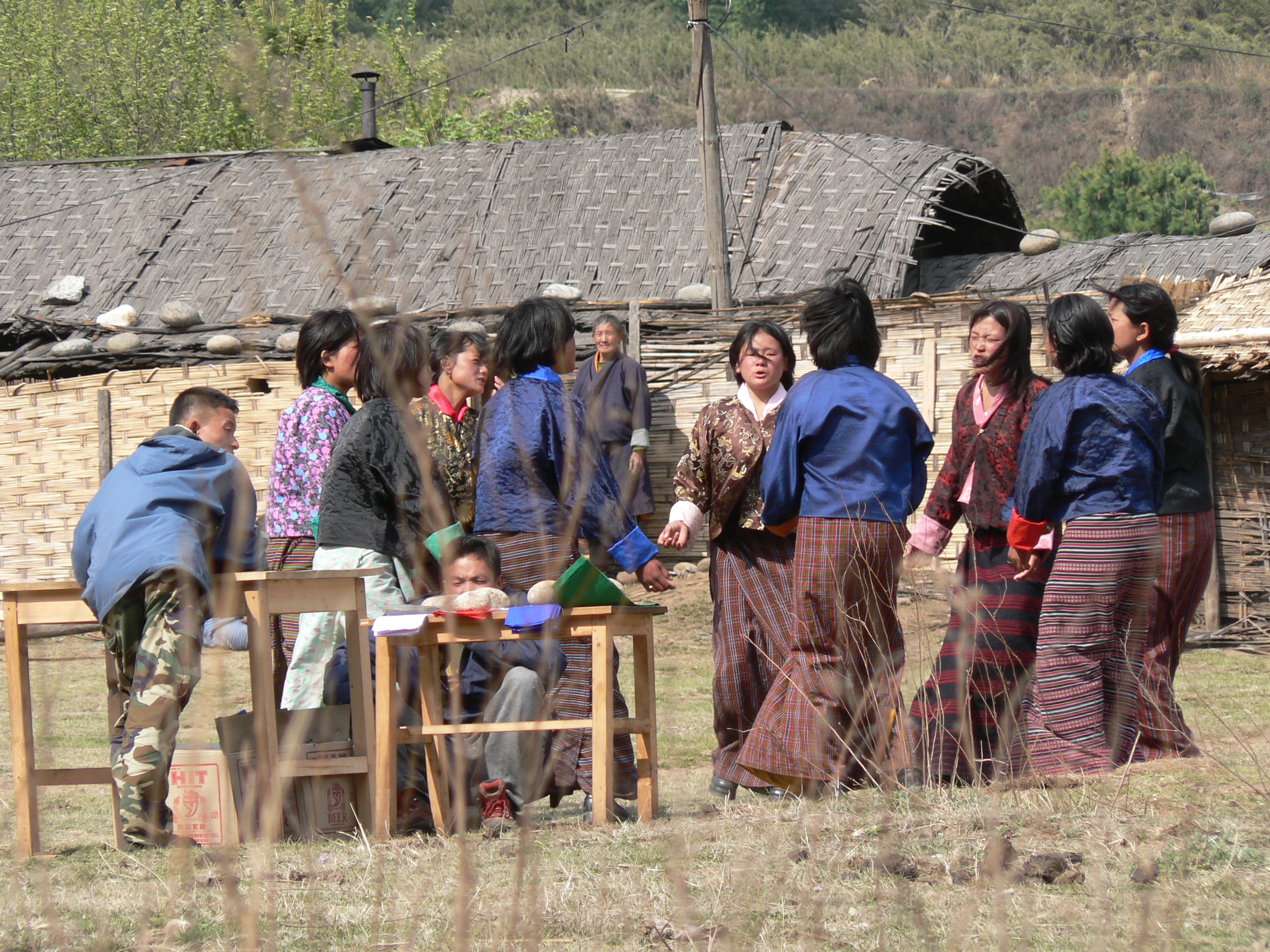
Archery cheerleading

Women in Bhutan are traditionally active participants in archery competitions, both at home and on the sidelines. To support their husbands, archers' wives prepare their best dishes and drinks. Their older children prepare and bring butter tea and alcoholic beverages to the shooting range, accompanied by younger children. Men participating in the match then bestow upon friends and the match coordinators food and beverages prepared by their wives.

During the matches, women cheer their husbands or favorites with heavily symbolic songs. They also mock opponents with distracting gesticulations and humorous insults. One insult goes: "Whose forehead is bulging and swollen like a wine-serving spoon, his arrow won't even hit the mark! But even if it does, it's the lowest score!, Ah kha kha thu lu lu!" (Kuchu pehew gi da mephog, phog rung bam i pchi lay yeen, Ah kha kha thu lu lu!) Another more burlesque insult goes: "Whose lips are black as a beard, his arrow won't even hit the mark! But even if it does, it's the lowest score!, Ah kha kha thu lu lu!" (Kha nag pu so da me phog, phog rung bam i pchi lay yeen, Ah kha kha thu lu lu!)

Regarding archery, one Bhutanese proverb says, "Archery and discus are to men, as songs and dances are to women," indicating archery is a traditionally male-dominated sport. Nonetheless, modern prominent archers include Dorji Dema and Tshering Chhoden, two Bhutanese women.

== Verbal battles ==
Competing archers also engage in verbal battle, giving players a chance to display intellectual and literary skills. In archery matches, bombarding opponents with verbal confrontation is equally important to scoring bullseyes. Players and teammates praise their own arrows, lend advice and encouragement to each other, and demean opponents in florid literary expressions known as kha shed. Competitors must be prepared to provoke or reply in an equal or more impressive literary fashion.

One such line from a verbal battle goes: "Where the vulture flies, my stone shall fly, there to collide." (Bjagoed phu sa do chap kay), demeaning the opponent and promising a bullseye to reset his team's score.

== History ==
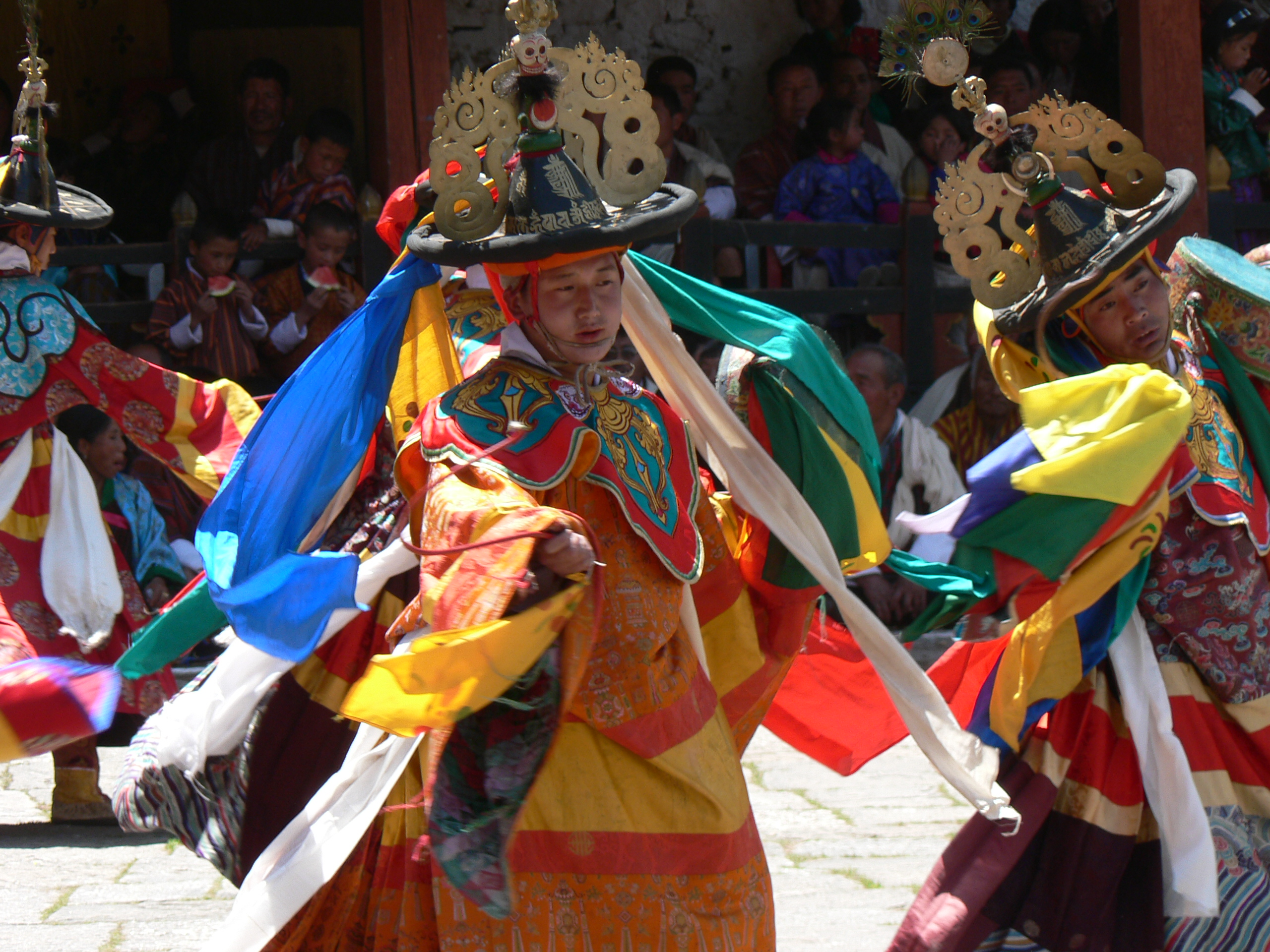
Black Hat Dance with drums, Paro Tsechu

Throughout the history of Bhutan, fire and the bow and arrow were an important means of survival in the highlands during war and on hunts. The bow and arrow play a significant role in many Bhutanese myths and legends; images of the gods holding a bow and arrows are considered especially favorable. Symbolic and religious significance of the bow and arrow is associated with the legendary murder of Tibetan King Langdarma in the 10th century. The king had persecuted Buddhism, and thus failed to perform his duty as he made mischief. A Buddhist monk, Lhalung Pelgyi Dorje, performed the Black Hat Dance to entertain the king, during which he feigned a bow before the king, drew a bow and arrow hidden in the big sleeves of a ceremonial dance costume, and killed the king.

In the 15th century, most prophecies by Lama Drukpa Kunley are believed to have originated from his bow and arrows. Modernly, the bow and arrows are an obligatory feature of any religious ceremony, ritual, festival, and holiday in Bhutan. Archery has also been a favorite sport of the King of Bhutan, handed down from generation to generation.

During the Bhutanese period of theocratic rule (1616–1907), there was no regular standing army. The bow and arrow were among the principal means of arming the population during frequent upheavals and invasions. During times of crisis, the government raised militias from among local lords' retinues, all commanded by one dapon (Dzongkha: མདའ་དཔོན་; Wylie: mdaa-dpon; 'arrow chief'). The title dapon continued to be used among military cadres well after the establishment of the Bhutanese monarchy in 1907.

The cultural significance of archery in Bhutan can be observed at shrines to local gods, where historically arrows were confiscated as tribute and in modern times are often left as offerings.

== Olympic Games ==
Bhutan has competed in Olympic Games since 1984. List of archers that have competed at the Olympic Games.

== Archery outside of Bhutan ==
=== Australia ===
In March 2022, 104 Bhutanese participated in an archery tournament in Canberra. It was called "Druk Hybrid Archery Championship". There were 21 teams with 5 members each.

== See also ==
- Bhutan Archery Federation
- Sports in Bhutan
- Bhutan at the Olympics
- Culture of Bhutan
- Tourism in Bhutan
