= Pundo =

Bhutanese sport

Pundo (Dzongkha: དཔུང་རྡོ་; Wylie: dpung-rdo; "strong-stone") is a traditional Bhutanese sport. It is a game played by laymen and consists of throwing a stone weighing over a kilo as far as possible. The throwing movement is from the shoulder, with the stone held flat in the hand.

== See also ==
- Sports in Bhutan
