= Shingkhar Lam =

Bhutanese politician (1928 – 2014)

Shingkhar Lam Kunzang Wangchuk (1928 – 16 October 2014) was a Bhutanese politician, who served as a speaker of the Gyelyong Tshogdu (national assembly of Bhutan). After his uncle went missing, he served two Druk Gyalpos (kings) of Bhutan. He created the insignia for the Royal Bhutan Army and rewrote the Druk Tsendhen (national anthem).

== Early life ==
Shingkhar Lam Kunzang Wangchuk was born in 1928 to Shingkhar Lam Koncho Gyaltshen and Pema Tshoki. He was a descendant of Longchenpa, a fourteenth-century Buddhist philosopher. He was recognized by his local community as the reincarnation of the lama Nyungne Rinpoche by the age of five, and soon entered into religious education and training. He visited Shingkhar, Kurtoe, and Zhongar for religious purposes.

== Career ==
At 16, he began serving Jigme Wangchuck, the second Druk Gyalpo (king) of Bhutan. According to Karma Phuntsho, a friend of Lam's, it was "customary" for vacancies in the king's court to be filled by relatives; Lam's uncle had served the king, but went missing around this time. After Jigme Wangchuck died, he retired for a few years, before serving the third Druk Gyalpo, Jigme Dorji Wangchuck. He was made a secretary to Jigme Dorji Wangchuck in 1964, and given the honorific Dasho in 1968. He was made speaker of the Gyelyong Tshogdu (the national assembly) and a deputy minister in 1971.

He created the insignia for the Royal Bhutan Army, and rewrote the Druk Tsendhen, the national anthem of Bhutan.

== Retirement and death ==
He retired in 1985. Since he was believed to be a reincarnated lama, he continued his religious duties in Shingkhar and Ura (the birthplace of a parent); there, he was referred to as Meme Dasho. In 1995, Karma Ura wrote a historical novel, The Hero with a Thousand Eyes, about Lam and the practice of Yulsung (quarantine), a type of disease control; Ura's novel is seen by Bhutanese scholars Adam Pain and Deki Pema as "thinly disguised biography" of him. Lam restored the Shingkhar Lhakhang, a monastery by his previously-incarnated "lineage", in 1999; he personally completed the artwork.

He died on 16 October 2014, a week after being admitted to a local hospital after experiencing a stroke.
