= Emblem of Bhutan =

- Armiger: Jigme Khesar Namgyel Wangchuck (Dragon King of Bhutan)
- Designer: A Mongolian artist Vector art: Pema Gyamtsho

The State emblem of Bhutan (རྒྱལ་ཡོངས་ལས་རྟགས་) maintains several elements of the flag of Bhutan, with slightly different artistry, and contains Mahayana Buddhist symbolism.

The state emblem of Bhutan was designed by a Mongolian artist and it was commissioned by Ashi Tashi Dorji, the sister of the Queen Grandmother. The dorji was a weapon used by Guru Rinpoche (Padmasambhāva) to quell evil spirits.

The official description of the emblem is as follows:

The national emblem, contained in a circle, is composed of a double diamond-thunderbolt (dorje) placed above a lotus, surmounted by a jewel and framed by two dragons. The thunderbolt represents the harmony between secular and religious power. The lotus symbolizes purity; the jewel expresses sovereign power; and the two dragons, male and female, stand for the name of the country which they proclaim with their great voice, the thunder.

National Emblem of Bhutan in black and white with Black Dzongkha Text

National Emblem of Bhutan in Color with White Dzongkha Text

National Emblem of Bhutan in black and white with White Dzongkha Text

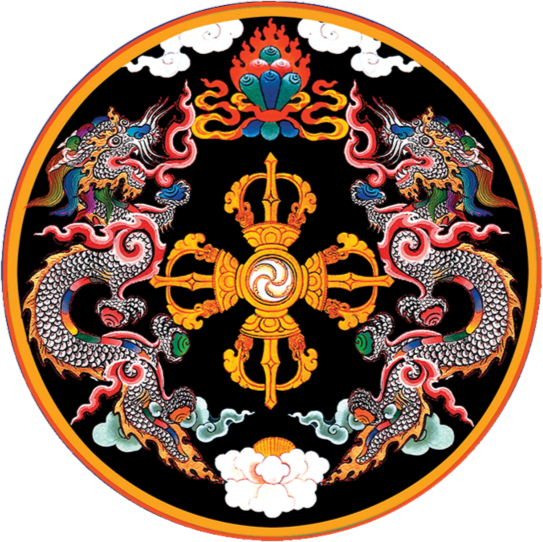
Other version of Emblem without text

== See also ==
- Flag of Bhutan
- Anthem of Bhutan
- National symbols of Bhutan
- Emblem of Tibet
- Emblem of Sikkim
