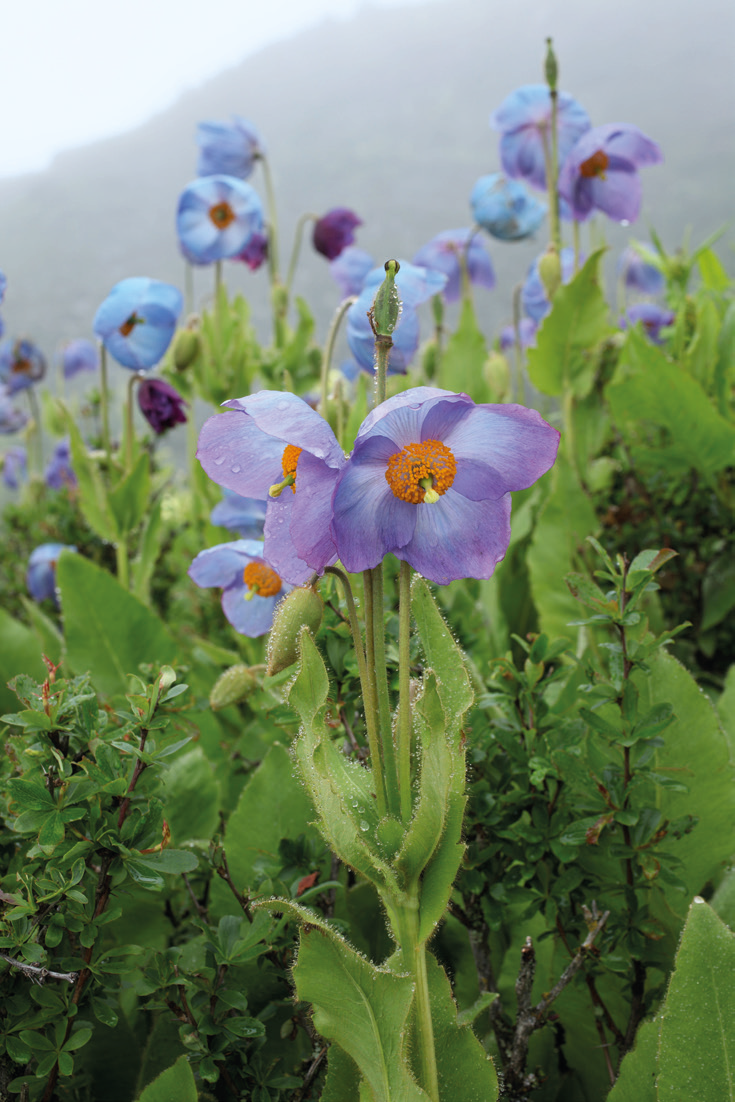

Scientific classification
- Kingdom: Plantae
- Clade: Embryophytes
- Clade: Tracheophytes
- Clade: Spermatophytes
- Clade: Angiosperms
- Clade: Eudicots
- Order: Ranunculales
- Family: Papaveraceae
- Genus: Meconopsis
- Species: M. gakyidiana

Binomial name
- Meconopsis gakyidiana Tosh.Yoshida, Yangzom & D.G.Long

= Meconopsis gakyidiana =

Species of flowering plant

Meconopsis gakyidiana (ཚེར་སྔོན་མེ་ཏོག in Dzongkha) is a species of blue poppy native to eastern Bhutan, western Arunachal Pradesh and southern Tibet. It is the national flower of Bhutan.

== Description ==
Meconopsis gakyidiana is a loose tuft-forming plant with short rhizomes and tall stems. Leaves are more or less alternate on the main stem and they are yellowish-green in color. Flowers are bowl-shaped and they usually change color from purple to blue, often pale blue-tinged with purple. Sometimes, flowers are dark red but this is rare. It is similar to Meconopsis baileyi but differs from by having bowl-shaped flowers with distinctly concave petals, orange-coloured thecae and longer style.

== Taxonomy ==
The national flower of Bhutan was thought previously to be Meconopsis grandis (previously treated as M. grandis subsp. orientalis). In 2017, following a collaboration between the Blue Poppy Society, Japan, and the National Biodiversity Center, Bhutan, it was found that this was a misidentification. Specimens collected by Frank Kingdon-Ward in 1938 on the Indian side of the border and by George Sherriff in 1934 in Bhutan have for a long time been treated as M. grandis. However, they differ significantly from typical plants of this species. Accordingly, a new species was described, Meconopsis gakyidiana. The specific epithet is derived from gakyi which is a Dzongkha word for happiness. The plant was named with the inspiration derived from the Bhutanese Development Philosophy of Gross National Happiness.

Another two new species of blue poppy were also described in addition to M. gakyidiana, Meconopsis merakensis and Meconopsis elongata. The new species can be found in Merak (མེ་རག), Sagteng (སག་སྟེང་) and Haa (ཧཱ) regions in Bhutan.

== Distribution and habitat ==
Meconopsis gakyidiana is currently distributed across eastern Bhutan, western Arunachal Pradesh in India, and southern Xizang (Tibet), from 3,700–4,300 m in elevation. It grows in the open shrubberies, lush pastures, beside rubble walls in grazing grounds, rarely on the sunny edge of sub-alpine forests, gregariously growing together with shrubs and other tall herbs.
