= Soksom =

Bhutanese sport

Soksom (Dzongkha: སོག་སོགམ་; Wylie: sog-sogm) is a traditional Bhutanese sport. It involves throwing a javelin at a distance of 20 metres (66 ft).
