= Druk =

Creature in Tibetan mythology and Bhutanese national symbol

The Flag of Bhutan features Druk

The Druk (Standard Tibetan: འབྲུག, Dzongkha: འབྲུག་) is the "thunder dragon" of Tibetan and Bhutanese mythology and a Bhutanese national symbol. A druk appears on the flag of Bhutan, holding jewels to represent wealth. In Dzongkha, Bhutan is called Druk Yul "Land of Druk", and Bhutanese leaders are called Druk Gyalpo, "Thunder Dragon Kings". During the Bhutanese mock election in 2007, all four mock parties were called the Druk [colour] Party. The national anthem of Bhutan, Druk tsendhen, translates into English as "Kingdom of Druk".

The druk (also known as a "duk" or "dug") was adopted as an emblem by the Drukpa Lineage, which originated in Tibet and spread to Bhutan. According to traditional accounts, when the sect's founder, Tsangpa Gyare, 1st Gyalwang Drukpa, began to build Ralung Monastery, there was a violent storm. Thunder, or the "Cloud-Voice", is seen as the roar of the dragon. Deciding that this was an omen, he named the monastery Drug-Ralung, adding the word "thunder dragon" to the name. The disciples at the monastery were known as Drugpa, or "Those of the Thunder." As of the 1900s, the Grand Lama of Bhutan wore a hat with thunder dragons on it to signify the origins of the sect. As the sect became more popular, it set up monasteries in what is now Bhutan, with the result that the area became known as Dug Yul, or Land of Thunder, among both Tibetans and Bhutanese.

== See also ==
- Emblem of Bhutan
- Bakunawa
- Chinese dragon
- Japanese dragon
- Korean dragon
- Pākhangbā
- Vietnamese dragon
