= Flag of Bhutan =

Kingdom of Bhutan
- Flag of Bhutan
- འབྲུག་ཡུལ་རྒྱལ་དར
- Use: National flag
- Proportion: 2:3
- Adopted: 1969; 57 years ago
- Design: Divided diagonally from the lower hoist-side corner to the upper fly-side corner; the upper triangle is yellow and the lower triangle is orange, with a white dragon holding four jewels in its claws centred along the dividing line and facing away from the hoist
- Designed by: Mayum Choying Wangmo Dorji and Dasho Shingkhar Lam Kuenzang Wangchuk

The national flag of Bhutan (Dzongkha: འབྲུག་ཡུལ་རྒྱལ་དར) is one of the national symbols of Bhutan. The flag features the Druk, a dragon from Bhutanese mythology. This alludes to the country's name in Dzongkha: འབྲུག་ཡུལ་ Druk Yul, meaning 'The Thunder Dragon Kingdom', as well as the Drukpa Lineage of Tibetan Buddhism—the dominant religion of Bhutan.

The basic design of the flag by Mayum Choying Wangmo Dorji dates to 1947. A version was displayed in 1949 at the signing of the Indo-Bhutan Treaty. A second version was introduced in 1956 for the visit of Druk Gyalpo Jigme Dorji Wangchuck to eastern Bhutan; it was based upon photos of its 1949 predecessor and featured a white Druk in place of the green original. Dasho Shingkhar Lam Kuenzang Wangchuk, the secretary to the third king Jigme Dorji Wangchuck, was asked to redesign the flag. He is responsible for the current design, which remained unchanged since 1969. It was to match the measurements of the flag of India, which they believed fluttered better than their own. Other modifications such as changing the red background colour to orange led to the current design, in use since 1969. The National Assembly of Bhutan codified a code of conduct in 1972 to formalize the flag's design and establish protocol regarding acceptable flag sizes and conditions for flying the flag.

== Current national flag ==
=== Design ===
The current flag is divided diagonally from the lower hoist-side corner, with the upper triangle yellow and the lower triangle orange. Centred along the dividing line is a large black and white dragon facing away from the hoist side. The dragon is holding a norbu, or jewel, in each of its claws. The background colours of the flag, yellow and orange, are identified as Pantone 116 and 165 respectively. Equivalents of these shades and the white of the Druk are specified by various other codes according to particular matching systems as indicated below.

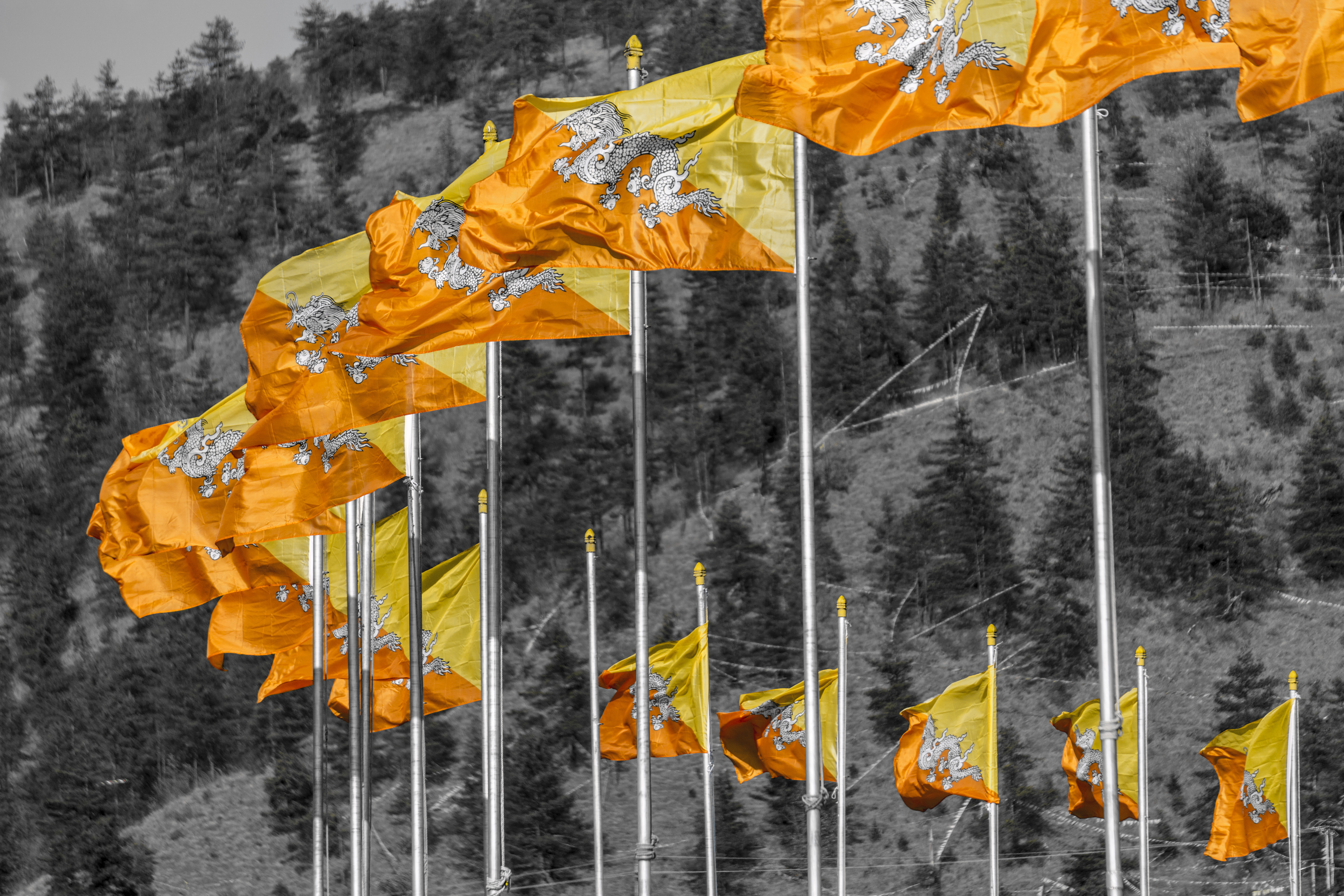
Bhutanese flags in Thimphu

Colour scheme	Yellow	Orange	White
RAL	RAL 1023; Yellow	RAL 2008; Orange	RAL 9003; White
CMYK	0.20.100.0	0.74.95.0	0.0.0.0
Pantone	116	165	n/a (white)
HTML Hexadecimals	#FFCD00	#FF691D	#FFFFFF
HTML Decimals	255,205,0	255.105.29	255.255.255

The dimensions of the flag must maintain a 3:2 ratio. The following sizes have been declared standard by the Government of Bhutan:

- 21 ft × 14 ft (6.4 m × 4.3 m)
- 12 ft × 8 ft (3.7 m × 2.4 m)
- 6 ft × 4 ft (1.8 m × 1.2 m)
- 3 ft × 2 ft (0.9 m × 0.6 m)
- 9 in × 6 in (23 cm × 15 cm), for car flags.

=== Symbolism ===
Variant of the Flag of Bhutan with a differently rendered dragon

According to The Legal Provisions of the National Flag of the Kingdom of Palden Drukpa as Endorsed in Resolution 28 of the 36th Session of the National Assembly held on 8 June 1972, and as restated in the Constitution of 2008, the yellow signifies civil tradition and temporal authority as embodied in the Druk Gyalpo, the Dragon King of Bhutan, whose royal garb traditionally includes a yellow kabney (scarf). The orange half signifies Tibetan Buddhist spiritual tradition, particularly the Drukpa Kagyu and Nyingma schools. The dragon spreads equally over the line between the colours. Its placement in the centre of the flag over the dividing line between the flag's two colours signifies the equal importance of both civic and monastic traditions in the Kingdom of Druk (Bhutan) and evokes the strength of the sacred bond between sovereign and people. The dragon's white colour signifies the purity of inner thoughts and deeds that unite all the ethnically and linguistically diverse peoples of Bhutan. The jewels held in Druk's claws represent Bhutan's wealth and the security and protection of its people, while the dragon's snarling mouth symbolizes Bhutanese deities' commitment to the defence of Bhutan.

== Historical evolution ==
The Centre for Bhutan Studies and GNH Research, an independent Bhutanese research centre, in 2002 issued a paper (henceforth the "CBS document") that is the only readily available account from Bhutan of the historical development of the national flag. The document draws heavily on first-hand accounts obtained through interviews with individuals personally involved in the creation and modification of the flag in Bhutan, from the late 1940s until the adoption of the current flag around 1970. This report is therefore a significant primary source for information about the history of the Bhutanese flag. But in the description of the flag from 1949, the document is not in complete accord with photos of the flag (as discussed below), making it difficult to interpret some of the document's assertions. As a record, however, of the few primary sources remaining – namely, the people involved in the flag's history and the handful of existing government records – it represents a valuable source of information about the otherwise poorly documented evolution of the Bhutanese flag.

=== First national flag (1949) ===
This illustration of the first national flag of Bhutan, used in 1949 at the signing of the Indo-Bhutan Treaty, is based upon black-and-white photos of the event with colours supplied from later documentation.

The CBS document states that the first national flag was designed upon the request of Jigme Wangchuck, the second Druk Gyalpo of the 20th-century Kingdom of Bhutan, and was introduced in 1949 during the signing of the Indo-Bhutan Treaty. While the document does not provide an illustration of the original design, black-and-white photographs taken at this historic event provide images of the first Bhutanese flag at the ceremony.

The design of the flag is credited to Mayum Choying Wangmo Dorji in 1947. Lharip Taw Taw, one of the few painters available to the royal court at the time, is said to have embroidered the flag. Druk was coloured green in accordance with traditional and religious references to yu druk ngon ma (Dzongkha: གཡུ་འབྲུག་སྔོནམ), or "turquoise druk". Today, a modern reproduction of this historic original (with several significant changes influenced by the modern flag) is displayed behind the throne in the National Assembly Hall in Thimphu.

According to the CBS document, the original Bhutanese flag was a bicolour square flag divided diagonally from the lower hoist to the upper fly. The field of yellow extended from the hoist to the upper fly, and the red field extended from the fly end to the lower hoist. In the centre of the flag, at the convergence of the yellow and red fields, is a green Druk, located parallel to the bottom edge and facing the fly.

However, the CBS document does not illustrate the early versions of the flag and its description of the 1949 flag is not entirely consistent with the photos surviving from 1949. It describes the flag as "square", while the proportions of the flag in the photographs appear closer to 4:5. The document describes the dragon as "facing the fly end", while the dragon visible in the photos faces the hoist. The dragon is described as "parallel to the fly" (meaning, according to a diagram in the document, parallel to the length along the bottom edge of the flag), while the dragon in the photos appears to have a slightly rising vertical slant. The dragon is described as "green", but the shade in the photos, if indeed green, must be very pale.

Western flag books until after 1970 generally show the Bhutanese flag closely resembling the 1949 photos.

=== Changes in 1956 ===
The second version of the national flag was developed in 1956 for the visit of the third Druk Gyalpo Jigme Dorji Wangchuk to eastern Bhutan. During the trip, the Druk Gyalpo's Secretariat began to use flags of a new design based upon a photograph of the first national flag of 1949, with the colour of the dragon changed from green to white. The retinue of the Druk Gyalpo included a convoy consisting of over one hundred ponies; a small version of the flag was placed on the saddle of every tenth pony, and a large flag approximately 6 square feet (0.56 m^{2}) in size was flown in the camp every evening, hoisted to the sound of a bugle.

=== Changes after 1956 ===
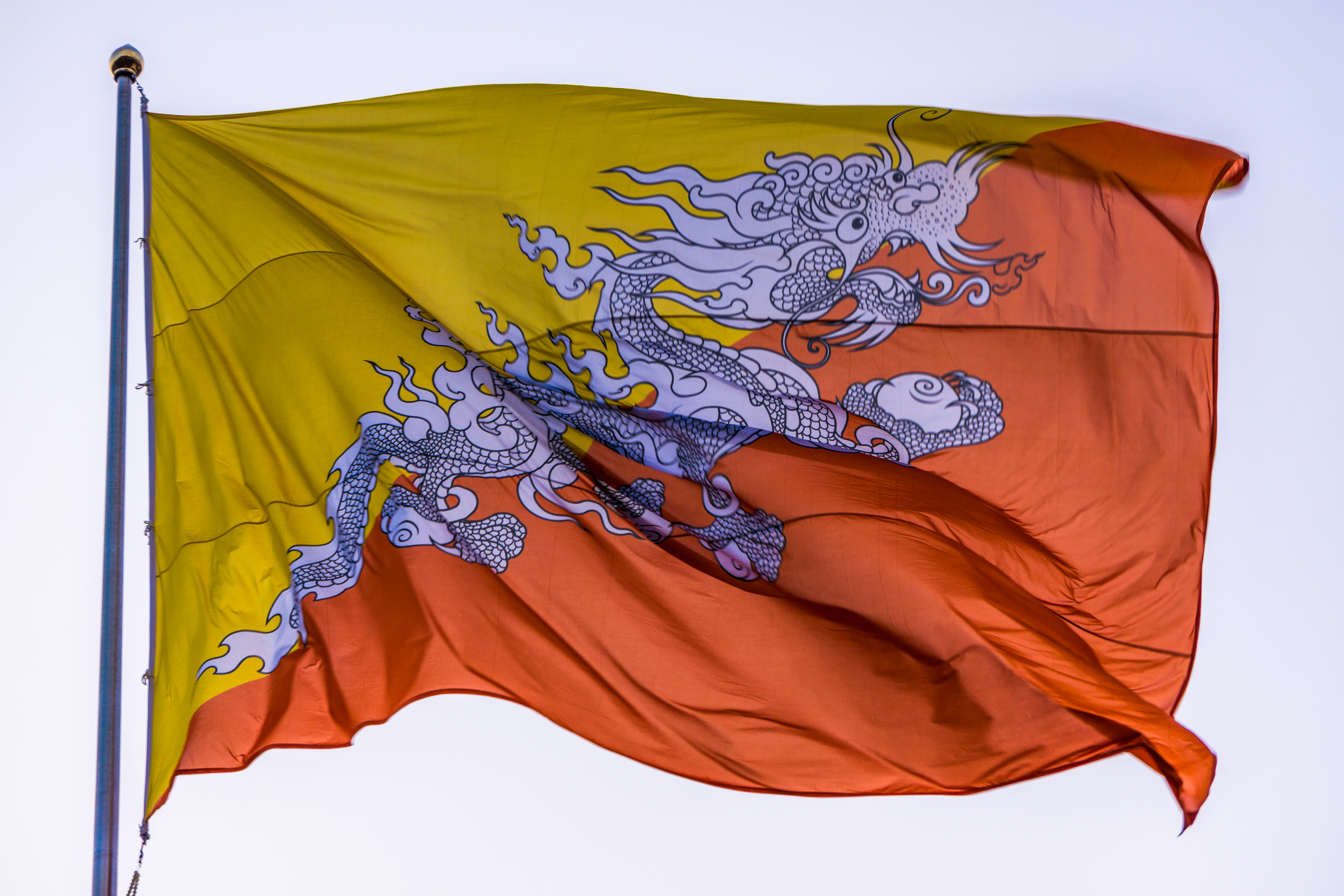
Flag of Bhutan

Beginning in the late 1950s, Dasho Shingkhar Lam, former Secretary to His Majesty King Jigme Dorji Wangchuck and Sixth Speaker of the National Assembly (1971–74), was requested by the king to make several modifications to the flag, leading eventually to the design of the current flag. During this period there does not appear to be a consistent design, but the flag has remained unchanged since 1969, when it achieved its current form. The king was reportedly dissatisfied that the early square Bhutanese flags did not flutter like the rectangular Indian flag displayed on the visit of an Indian official to the country. The standard measurements of the flag of Bhutan were thereafter altered to resemble the flag of India, which was 9 feet by 6 feet.

In another change, the dragon, which had formerly been placed in a roughly horizontal position in the centre of the flag, was repositioned to spread out over the diagonal dividing line between the background colours. This change sought to avoid having the dragon "face the earth" when the flag was hanging limp. Bhutanese artist Kilkhor Lopen Jada painted a new design for the druk in which the curves of the dragon's body are relaxed to create a somewhat longer and more gently undulating shape.

The CBS document states that the king ordered the colour of the lower half changed from red to orange "sometime in 1968 or 69."

The Bhutanese flag was flown abroad beside another nation's flag for the first time in 1961 during a state visit to India by Jigme Dorji Wangchuck. This visit inaugurated a new level of relations between the two countries.

== Code of conduct ==
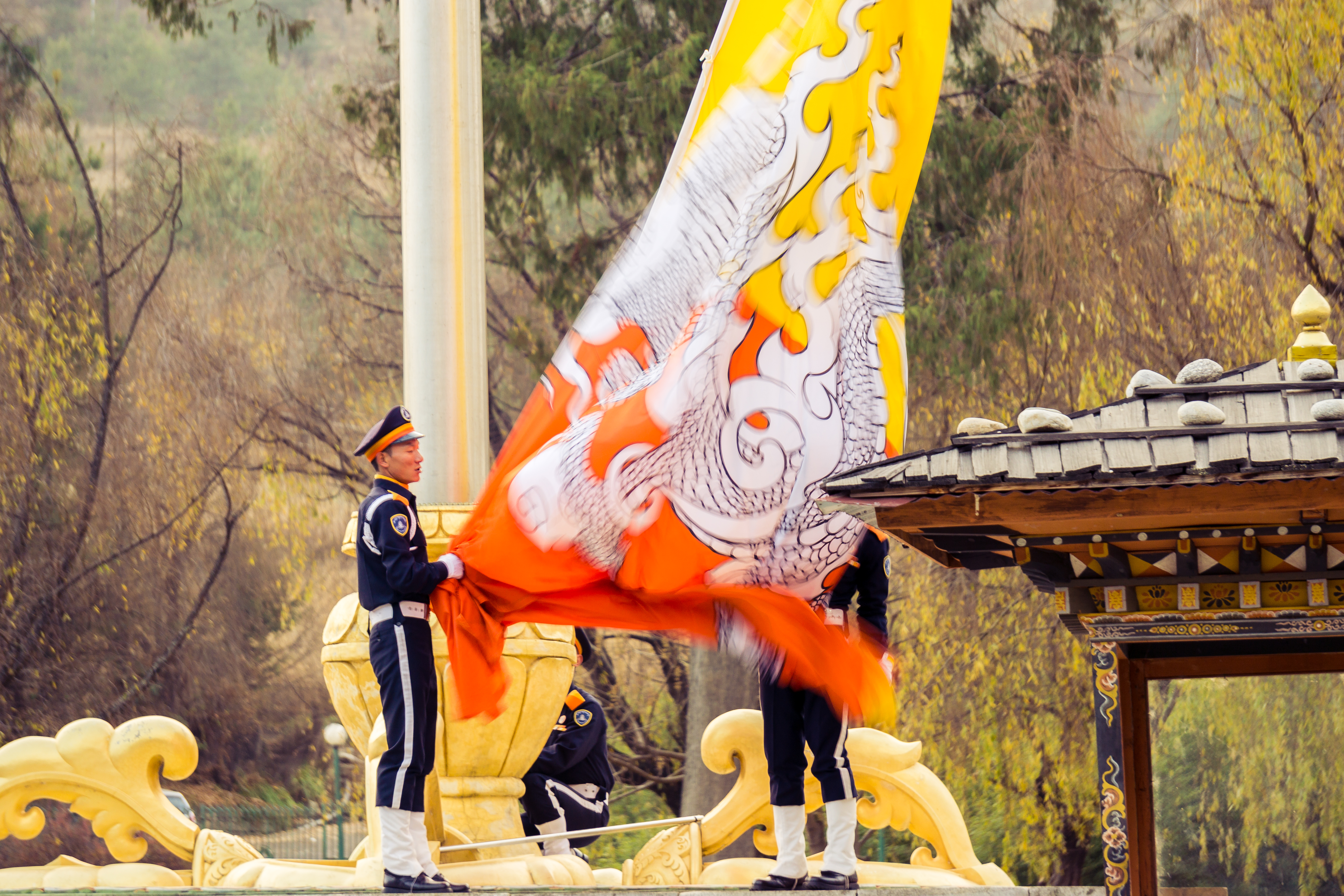
A large Bhutanese flag being lowered

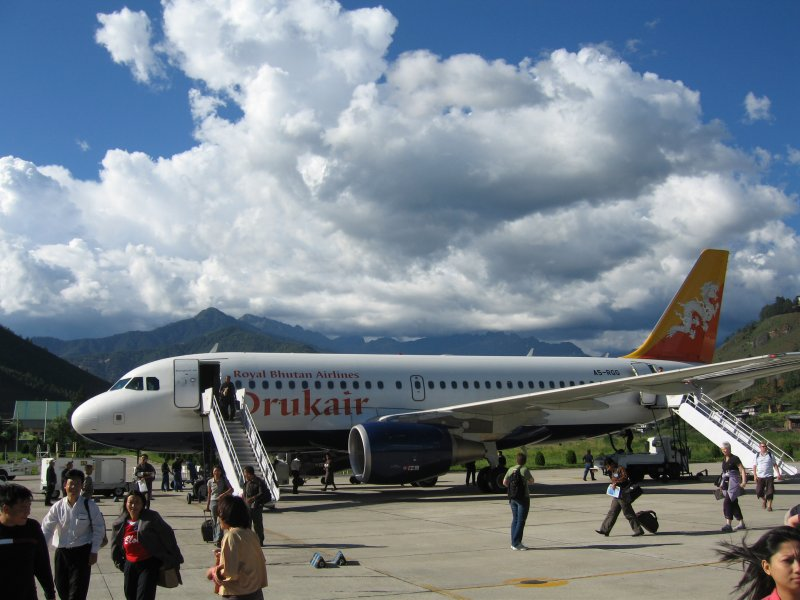
The flag of Bhutan figures on the livery of the national airline Druk Air.

On 8 June 1972, the National Assembly of Bhutan approved Resolution 28, bringing into effect National Flag Rules drafted by the Cabinet. The rules have eight provisions covering the description and symbolism of the flag's colouring, fields and design elements. Other rules relate to the size of the flag as well as flag protocol including the appropriate places and occasions for flying the flag and who may display the flag on cars. In general, the flag is given as much respect as the Bhutanese state and the head of state. As in the United States Flag Code, no other flags must be placed higher than the Bhutanese flag, the flag cannot be used as a cover or drape (with some exceptions) and the flag must not touch the ground. Other provisions include prohibitions on including the design in other objects or in a logo. Exceptionally, the flag may be used to drape coffins, but only those of high-ranking state officials such as ministers or military personnel.

The 1972 rules also provide that "every dzongkhag [district headquarters] will hoist the national flag. Where there are no dzongkhag, the national flag will be hoisted in front of the office of the main government officer".

Officials above the rank of minister are allowed to fly the flag at their residence provided they do not live near the capital. The tradition of flying the national flag in front of government offices had not existed in Bhutan prior to 1968 but was decreed standard practice by the Druk Gyalpo after his Secretariat was moved from the city of Taba to Tashichho Dzong in that year. The only flag day prescribed in the 1972 rules is National Day, which is held annually on 17 December. National Day commemorates the crowning of Ugyen Wangchuck as the first king of Bhutan on 17 December 1907.

== See also ==
- List of Bhutanese flags
- Emblem of Bhutan
- Flag of the Qing dynasty
- National anthem of Bhutan
- National symbols of Bhutan
