= Bhutan Archery Federation =

Governing body of archery in Bhutan

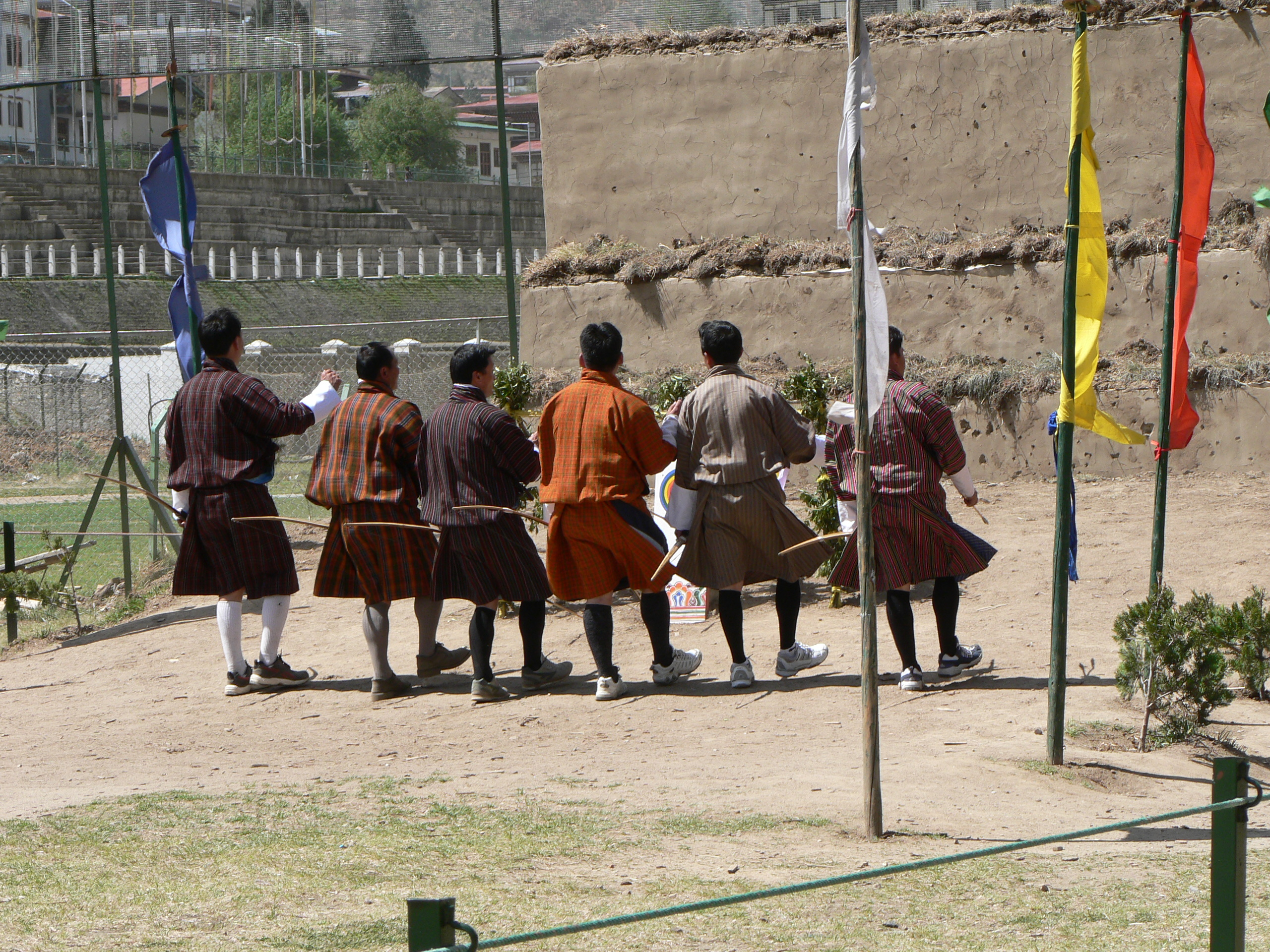
Archery dance on hitting the bullseye, Thimphu

The Bhutan Archery Federation is an organization that occupies itself with the conservation and further development of traditional archery in Bhutan. The sporting body also governs Olympic archery in Bhutan. The federation was founded in 1971 in the country's capital Thimphu.

The federation organizes local and international matches. For the population, archery signifies more than sport alone, since it is surrounded by various traditions and spirituality. According to legend, these traditions go back to the times of Siddhartha Gautama. The organization relies entirely on volunteers.

The Bhutan Archery Federation was honored with a Prince Claus Award in 2004 for "its members role in sustaining and developing archery as a dynamic expression of local cultural values."

== See also ==
- Archery in Bhutan
- Changlimithang Stadium
