= Flag of the Qing dynasty =

Chinese national flag (1889–1912)

Qing dynasty
- Yellow Dragon Flag (黃龍旗)
- Use: National flag and ensign
- Proportion: 2:3
- Adopted: 1889; 137 years ago
- Relinquished: February 12, 1912
- Design: Blue dragon on plain yellow, with a red pearl at the upper left corner.
- Earlier version of Yellow Dragon Flag
- Use: State and war flag, state and naval ensign
- Proportion: 56:87
- Adopted: 1862; 164 years ago
- Use: Imperial Standard
- Proportion: 56:87
- Adopted: 1862; 164 years ago
- Design: The Imperial Standard for the Emperor of China

The flag of the Qing dynasty was an emblem adopted in 1889 featuring the Azure Dragon on a plain yellow field with the red flaming pearl in the upper left corner. It became the first national flag of China and is usually referred to as the "Yellow Dragon Flag" (traditional Chinese: 黃龍旗; simplified Chinese: 黄龙旗; pinyin: huánglóngqí).

Ruling China from 1644 until the overthrow of the monarchy during the Xinhai Revolution, the Qing dynasty was the last imperial dynasty in Chinese history. Between 1862 and 1912, the dynasty represented itself with the dragon flag.

On January 10, 1912, the Yellow Dragon Flag was replaced by the Five-Colored Flag, and on February 12 Emperor Pu Yi abdicated, ending the rule of the Qing Dynasty.

== Designs ==
Since the Ming dynasty, yellow was considered the royal color of successive Chinese emperors. Members of the imperial family of China at that time were the only ones allowed to display the color yellow in buildings and on garments. The Emperor of China usually used a Chinese dragon as a symbol of the imperial power and strength. Generally, a five-clawed dragon was used by emperors only.

A flaming pearl is shown on top of the dragon's head, in Chinese culture the pearl is associated with wealth, good luck, and prosperity.

The design of the flag was largely based on the Plain Yellow Banner, one of three "upper" banner armies among the Eight Banners under the direct command of the Emperor of China himself, and one of the four "right wing" banners.

The Eight Banners

The Eight Banners were administrative/military divisions under the Qing dynasty into which all Manchu households were placed. In war, the Eight Banners functioned as armies, but the banner system was also the basic organizational framework of all of Manchu society.

Plain Yellow Banner

Bordered Yellow Banner

Plain White Banner

Bordered White Banner
Plain Red Banner

Bordered Red Banner

Plain Blue Banner

Bordered Blue Banner 1911 -1912

== Triangular version (1862–1889) ==
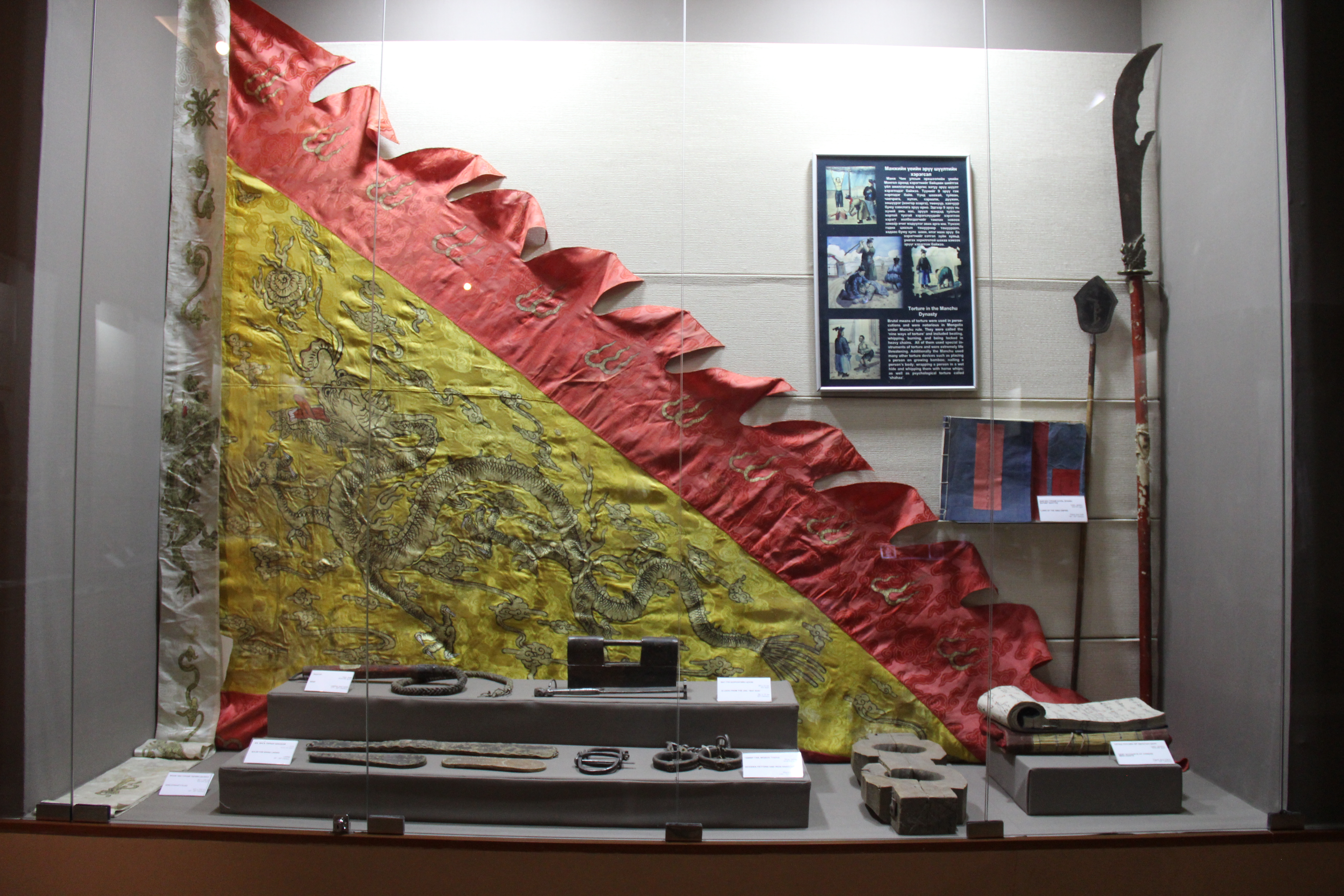
The actual triangular flag displayed in the National Museum of Mongolia.

The Arrow Incident of 1856 occurred as a result of Chinese civilian vessels flying foreign flags as the Qing dynasty had no official flag at the time. In 1862, sailors from the Chinese and British navies clashed at Wuhan on the Yangtze River. In response to protests from the British government that their ships were unable to properly distinguish between Chinese navy ships and civilian vessels, Yixin (Prince Gong) urged Zeng Guofan to create a governmental flag for the Qing, and suggested use of a yellow dragon flag, which was also used as one of the Eight Banners of the Manchu as well as in the Chinese army. After due consideration, Zeng Guofan concluded that a square flag bore too close a resemblance to the Plain Yellow Banner of the Eight Banners with the potential to be viewed as an endorsement of the Eight Banners hierarchy, he instead removed one corner to create a triangular flag.

The triangular version of the yellow dragon flag was restricted to naval and governmental use only, no civilian ships were permitted to fly the yellow pennant, and it never formally became the national flag. An exception was on 23 February 1873, when the regency of the Tongzhi Emperor ended and he assumed direct rule of the Qing empire. On that day all ships flew the triangular flag for the first time in celebration. Also on some diplomatic occasions, this flag was used to represent China.

== Rectangular version (1889–1912) ==
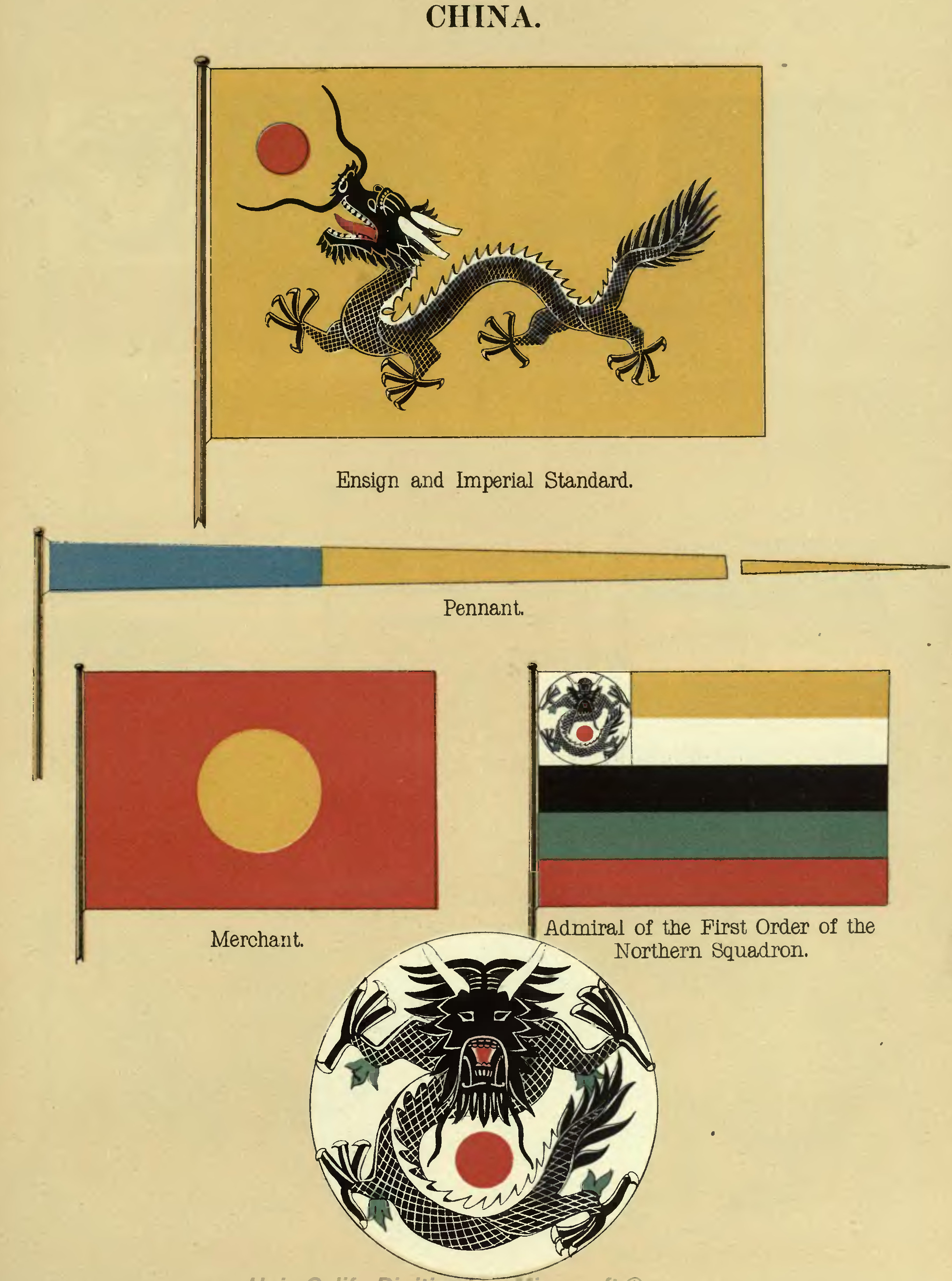
An introduction to national flags in 1899.

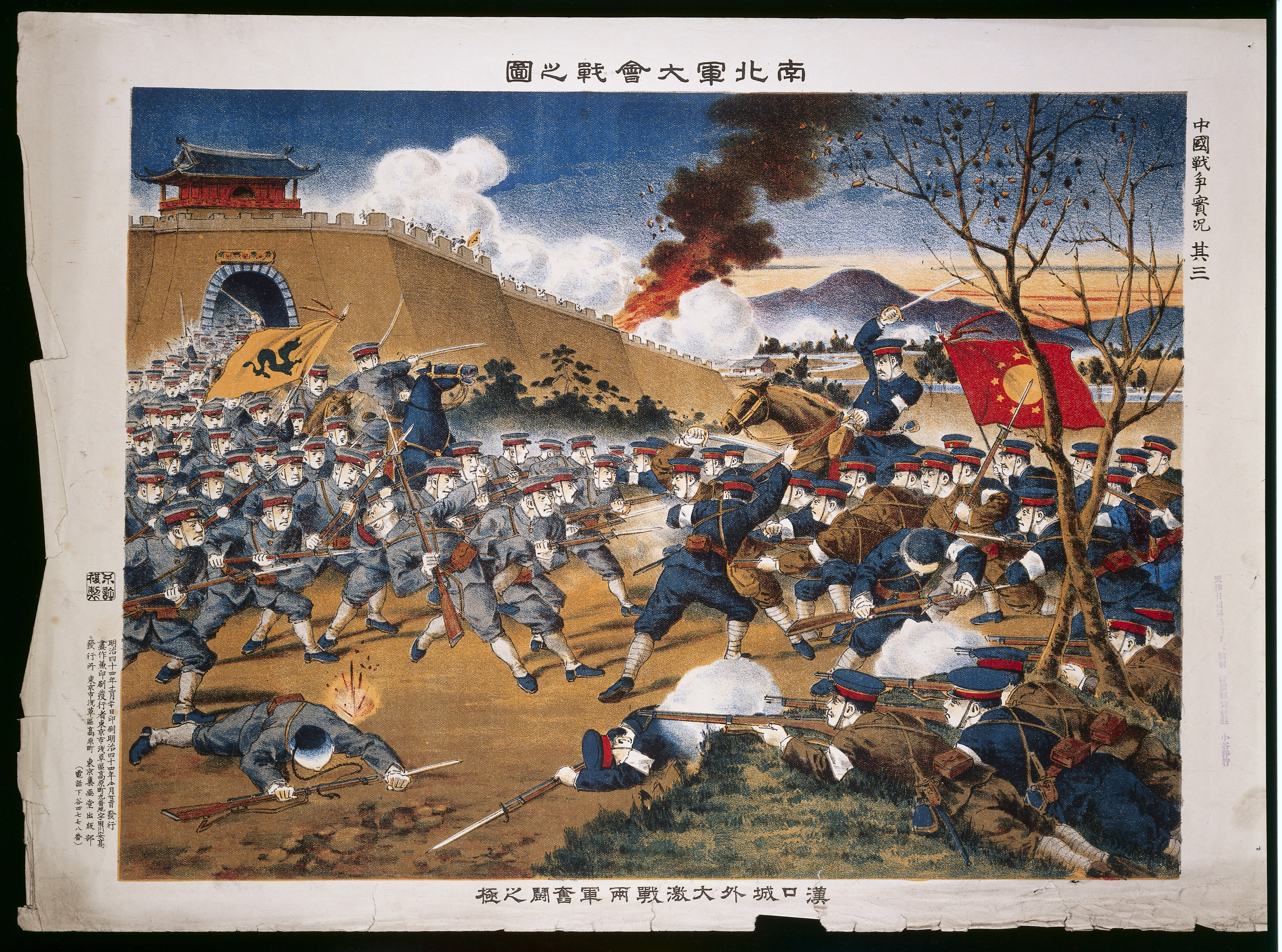
Image of a battle of the 1911 Revolution; Qing flag visible at left.

In September 1881, when the two cruisers Chaoyong and Yangwei ordered from Birkenhead, England were sent to China, Li Hongzhang realized a triangular ensign was unique among naval flags of other countries. As a result, he petitioned the imperial court for permission and subsequently altered the triangular naval flag into a rectangular one.

Seeing Western countries flying national flags on official occasions, Li Hongzhang also asked Empress Dowager Cixi to select a national flag for the Qing dynasty. Among the proposals for use of the Ba gua flag, the Yellow dragon flag and the Qilin flag, Cixi selected the Yellow dragon design. In 1888, the imperial court promulgated the naval flag as the Qing national flag.

== Influence ==
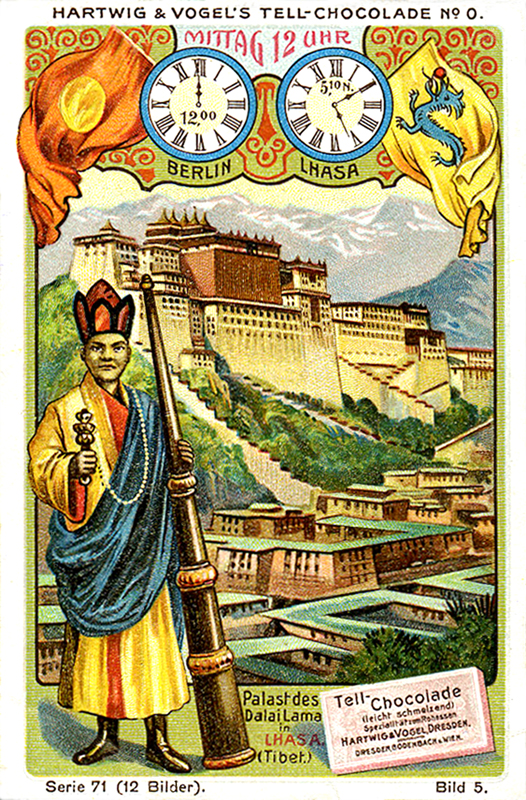
The Palace of the Dalai Lama in Lhasa (Tibet). This is a collector card from series 71, "Scenes From Around the World - midday in Berlin", #5/12 card. Yellow Dragon Flag, within the upper right part.

Another flag of the Qing dynasty

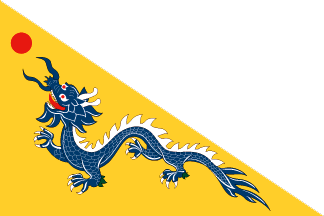
Another triangular flag of the Qing dynasty

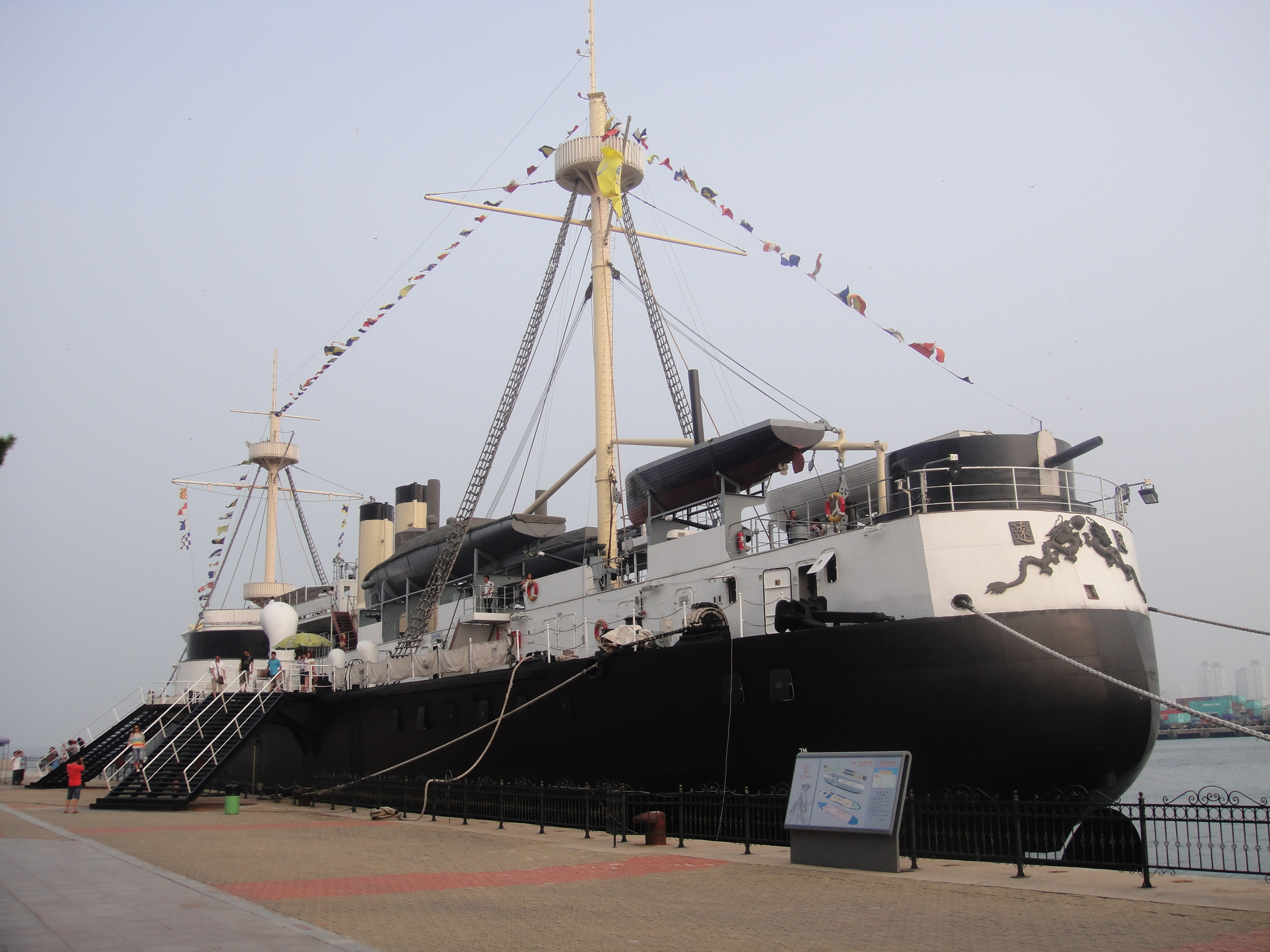
A replica of the Dingyuan, flagship of the Beijing fleet with the Qing flag in 2012

The notion of yellow as representative of Manchu ethnicity was used in the flags of the Five Races Under One Union flag of the Republic of China, and on the flag of the Empire of China, respectively, although in 1912 the former was challenged by Sun Yat-sen, who thought it inappropriate to use the traditional imperial color to represent Manchu ethnicity. Also, mustard yellow was used in the flag of Manchukuo in deference to the Qing dynasty, on whose flag it was based.

The blue dragon was featured in the Twelve Symbols national emblem, which was the state emblem of China from 1913 to 1928.

== Naval flags of Qing dynasty ==
Horatio Nelson Lay's Proposal (1862)

When the Qing dynasty purchased warships from the United Kingdom in 1862, Horatio Nelson Lay designed several naval flags based on the custom flag he designed. These proposals were not recognized by the Qing dynasty government.

Proposed Chinese naval ensign, designed by Horatio Nelson Lay.

Beiyang Fleet (1874–1890)

The Beiyang Fleet was created in 1874, and several rank flags were introduced based on the traditional five color officials' flags of the old Chinese navy.

Admiral's Flag

Deputy Commanders's Flag

High-ranking Official's Flag, for officials other than navy

Beiyang Navy (1890–1909)

The Beiyang Fleet became the national navy by Regulations of the Beiyang Fleet in 1888. However, rank flags were not updated until 1890, when William Metcalfe Lang and Liu Buchan disputed about their rank flags in an incident. Therefore, the British Royal Navy advisers proposed five new rank flags to replace the simple two rank flags system.

Proposed Admiral's Flag

Proposed Vice Admiral's Flag

Proposed Rear Admiral's Flag

Proposed Commodore 1st Class's Flag

Proposed Commodore 2nd Class's Flag

However these proposals were not adopted by the Qing dynasty. New rank flags were introduced later in 1890.

Admiral's Flag

High-ranking Official's Flag

Commander of Torpedo Boats' Flag

Commodore's Flag

Imperial Navy (1909–1911)

After the total defeat of the Beiyang Navy in First Sino-Japanese War in 1894, the new imperial navy was reorganized following the establishment of the department of the navy in 1909. The Imperial Chinese Navy adopted the national flag in the canton of naval flags in 1909.

Secretary's Flag

Admiral's Flag

Vice Admiral's Flag

Rear Admiral's Flag
Senior Officer's Flag

Fleet Leader's Flag

== Flags based on the Qing dynasty flag ==
Chinese Eastern Railway

The flag of the Chinese Eastern Railway adopted a combination of Qing dynasty and Russian flags. The flag was not updated until 1912.

Flag of the Chinese Eastern Railway (1897−1912)
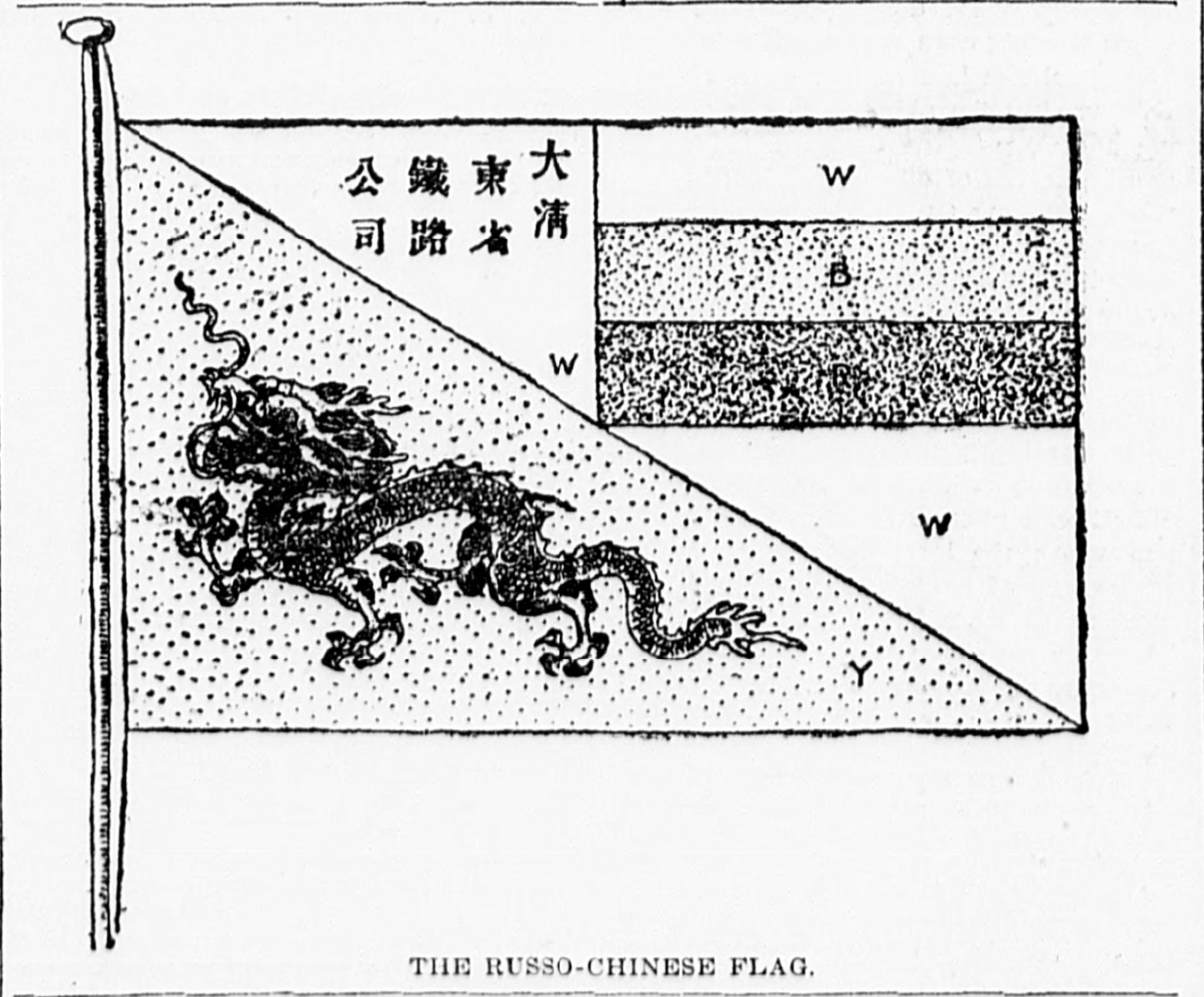
1899 drawing of the "Russo-Chinese" flag.

Commissioner of Weihaiwei (1899–1903)

Until 1903, the flag of the Commissioner of Weihaiwei used a Chinese dragon in the flag.

The flag of the Commissioner of Weihaiwei (1899–1903)

== See also ==
- Flag of Bhutan
- List of Chinese flags
