= Ara (drink) =

Bhutanese alcoholic beverage

- Type: Rice wine
- Origin: Tibet, Bhutan, Tibet Autonomous Region, Arunachal Pradesh
- Introduced: Monpa people, Bhutanese people
- Ingredients: Fermentation of rice

Ara, or Arag, (Tibetan and Dzongkha: ཨ་རག་; Wylie: a-rag; "alcohol, liquor") is a traditional alcoholic beverage consumed in Bhutan and Indian state of Arunachal Pradesh. Ara is made from native high-altitude tolerant barley, rice, maize, millet, or wheat, and may be either fermented or distilled. The beverage is usually a clear, creamy, or white color.

== Production ==
Ara is most commonly made from rice or maize at private homes or farms. Ara may be either fermented or distilled, and in Bhutan is only legally produced and consumed privately. Ara production is unregulated in both method and quality, and its sale is prohibited in Bhutan. Previously, private individuals sold ara through shopkeepers despite the prohibition and faced a harsh government crackdown. However, because Ara returns far more profit than other forms of maize, many Bhutanese farmers have pressed for legal reform. The Bhutanese government, meanwhile, is intent on discouraging excessive alcohol consumption, abuse, and associated diseases through taxation and regulation.

Ara is also produced for religious purposes, especially in eastern Bhutan, where it serves as a Lhasoel offering on certain auspicious days. Ara is also believed to chemically ward off snakes, and is sometimes carried by children for protection.

Through government efforts to reduce ara production and consumption in Lhuntse District, eastern Bhutan, locals conceded something should be done to curb the distinctly eastern Bhutanese tradition of heavy drinking. The government's strategy is to reduce ara production and consumption gradually until it is eliminated. Alcoholism and ara production have been notable topics of political discussion Bhutan, especially at the local level.

== Consumption ==
Ara is usually consumed hot. It may be served neat, with smooth additives like butter and poached egg, or with chunky additives like scrambled egg and rice.

== See also ==
- Arak
- Bhutanese cuisine
- Culture of Bhutan
- Health in Bhutan
- List of Tibetan dishes
- Moonshine
- Tibetan cuisine
