= Druk Tsenden =

National anthem of Bhutan

English: The Thunder Dragon Kingdom
- འབྲུག་ཙན་དན།
- National anthem of Bhutan
- Lyrics: Dorji Lopen Droep Namgay; Dasho Gyaldun Thinley
- Music: Aku Tongmi, 1953
- Adopted: 1953

"Druk Tsenden" (Dzongkha: འབྲུག་ཙན་དན།, Dzongkha pronunciation: [ɖ(ʐ)ṳ̀e̯ t͡sén.d̥è̤n]; "The Thunder Dragon Kingdom") is the national anthem of Bhutan. Adopted in 1953, the lyrics were written by Dolop Droep Namgay and possibly translated into English by Dasho Gyaldun Thinley. The accompanying music was composed by Aku Tongmi.

== History ==
Despite claims made in Brozović's Enciklopedija (1999) and many subsequent authors, who attribute the authorship of the national anthem to Gyaldun Thinley, father of the former Prime Minister Jigme Thinley, there are many who believe that the words and the national anthem itself were penned by Dorji Lopen Dolop Droep Namgay of Talo, Punakha. The Dorji Lopen is the most senior of the four senior Lopens in Bhutan's religious establishment, and often serves as the Deputy Je Khenpo. Dolop Droep Namgay maintained close personal and working relations with the third King of Bhutan, Jigme Dorji Wangchuck, during whose reign Gyaldun Thinley served in various capacities.

It is possible that Gyaldun Thinley may have been involved in working closely with Dolop Droep Namgay and translating the lyrics into English. It is also highly likely that he (and/or his son Jigme Thinley who served in many important government and political capacities since the 1990s) was one of the persons of first contact for Dalibor Brozović who attributed Gyaldun Thinley as the author of the lyrics; however, many regard Dolop Droep Namgay as the author.

Aku Tongmi was educated in Shillong, India and had recently been appointed leader of the military brass band when the need for an anthem rose at the occasion of a state visit from the Indian Prime Minister Jawaharlal Nehru. His original score was inspired by the Bhutanese folk tune "The Unchanging Lotus Throne" (Thri nyampa med pa pemai thri). The melody has twice undergone changes by Tongmi's successors as band leaders. The original lyrics were 12 lines, but were shortened to the present six-line version in 1964 by a secretary to the king.

As the anthem is inspired by a folk tune, there is a choreography to it as well, originally directed by Tongmi.

In 1953, His majesty the king Jigme Dorji Wangchuk ordered to compose a national anthem for Bhutan. So, the lyrics, choreography and tune were then composed taking the national anthem of England and India as a references.

== Lyrics ==
The lyrics to the national anthem are inscribed in the Constitution of Bhutan.

Dzongkha original

འབྲུག་ཙན་དན་བཀོད་པའི་རྒྱལ་ཁབ་ནང་༎
དཔལ་ལུགས་གཉིས་བསྟན་སྲིད་𝄆སྐྱོང་བའི་མགོན་𝄇༎
འབྲུག་རྒྱལ་པོ་མངའ་བདག་རིན་པོ་ཆེ་༎
སྐུ་འགྱུར་མེད་བརྟན་ཅིང་𝄆ཆབ་སྲིད་འཕེལ་𝄇༎
ཆོས་སངས་རྒྱས་བསྟན་པ་དར་ཞིང་རྒྱས་༎
འབངས་བདེ་སྐྱིད་ཉི་མ་𝄆ཤར་བར་ཤོག་𝄇༎

Official romanization (Note: The official Dzongkha romanization endorsed by the Constitution of Bhutan, devised by Dr. George van Driem.)

Dru tsend°en kepä gäkhap na
Pä lu’nyi tensi 𝄆 kyongwä gin 𝄇
Dru gäpo ’ngada rinpoche
Ku gyûme tencing 𝄆 chap si phe 𝄇
Chö sanggä tenpa dâzh°ing gä
Bang deki nyima 𝄆 shâwâsho. 𝄇

IPA transcription (Note: See Help:IPA and Dzongkha § Phonology.)

[ɖ(ʐ)ṳ̀e̯ t͡sén.d̥è̤n ké.pɛ́ː | gɛ̤̀ː(l).kʰɑ́(p̚) nɑ̤̀]
[pɛ́ː(l) lɔ̤̀ː.ɲ(j)ɪ́ː tɛ́ːn.sɪ́ | 𝄆 cɔ́ːŋ.wɛ̤̀ː gɪ̤̀n 𝄇]
[ɖ(ʐ)ṳ̀e̯ gɛ̤̀ː(l).pó ŋɑ́.dɑ̤̀ | rɪ̤̀n.pó.t͡ɕʰé]
[kúe̯ ɟʊ̤̀ː.mè̤ tɛ́n.t͡ɕɪ́ːŋ | 𝄆 t͡ɕʰɑ́(p̚) sɪ́ pʰé(l) 𝄇]
[t͡ɕʰǿ sɑ́ːŋ.gɛ̤̀ː tɛ́n.pɑ́ | dɑ̤̀ː.ʑ̥ɪ́ːŋ gɛ̤̀ː(l)]
[bɑ̤̀ːŋ dè̤.kɪ́ ɲ(j)ɪ̤̀.mɑ̤̀ | 𝄆 ɕɑ́ː.wɑ̤̀ː.ɕó 𝄇]

Official English translation

In the Kingdom of Bhutan adorned with cypress trees,
The Protector who reigns over the realm of spiritual and secular traditions,
He is the King of Bhutan, the precious sovereign.
May His being remain unchanging, and the Kingdom prosper,
May the teachings of the Enlightened One flourish,
May the sun of peace and happiness shine over all people.

== See also ==
- Flag of Bhutan
- Emblem of Bhutan
- National symbols of Bhutan
