= Digor (sports) =

Traditional sport in Bhutan

Digor or degor is a traditional sport in Bhutan, somewhat resembling the sport of shot put.

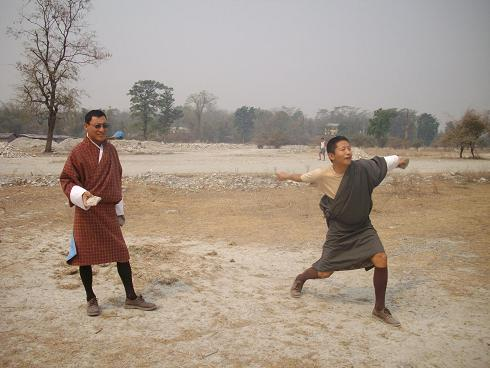
Playing digor

Digor is played with a pair of spherical flat stones that are hurled at two targets (pegs) fixed in the ground about 20 meters apart. The game is played all over Bhutan, but typically more in rural areas, and more often by men.

The only required equipment for playing the game is a pair of flat spherical stones for each player. The size and weight of the stones differ from player to player depending on his choice and strength. A player can have as many stones of any size as he wants, but can play only two at a time.

Digor can be played as a team game or individual game. If there are three persons, the game is played as on individual gaming basis. If there are four or more persons, it is preferred to be played in two teams that compete against each other. There is no fixed numbers of players on the teams, but too many players make the game slower and cumbersome. So, normally seven players on each team is the maximum number for an ideal game.

Unlike shot put, each player hurls a pair of spherical stones to the targets from one end to the other by swinging the arm below the shoulders. The target pegs are nailed into the ground with their tips at ground level. As in horseshoes, the players try to make their stone land and remain closest to the target peg. A point is scored if the distance between stone and the peg is less than the distance between the thumb and middle finger of an outstretched palm. If two or more stones of opponent teams fall in same range, the closest stone will score the point. If all stones in the range belong to one team, then the team will score as many points as the number of stones. There is no fixed point score at which the game ends, but it is normally fixed at odd numbers up to 21, depending on the number of the players and the time the teams have.

Unlike in archery, in digor the best players play first to occupy the area near the target. The players playing later are allowed to hit the stones of opponent players that have been played before with their own stones to displace them from the target and replace them with their stones. But it is more difficult if the stones played beforehand are heavy and solid. So, players prefer heavier stones so that these cannot be easily displaced or can be used as a better force to displace other players' stones.

Betting on the game differs from region to region and the occasion of the game being played. If the game is being played between villages, there may or may not be a bet. At times it is just played for the fame of victory. However, the game is mostly played to celebrate some occasions such as New Year and other major holidays. On such occasions, the betting is normally fixed on a grand feast and party where the loser will have to stand for the party solely or major chunk while the winner could share a little part. This kind of betting usually occurs for merrymaking and socializing within the communities or among the friends.
