= Kera (clothing) =

Cloth belt

A kera is a cloth belt, a key element of Bhutanese traditional attire used to tie Gho and Kira, functioning as a type of sash or waistband.

== Material ==
Kera is a rectangular piece of woven fabric that has fringed ends. It is made with different materials such as cotton, wool, and silk or by mixing them. The traditional kera constitutes an elongated and slender textile crafted from cotton or wild silk, embellished with horizontal bands of supplementary-weft patterning. Its standard dimensions generally range from 30 to 45 cm in width and 180 to 240 cm in length.

== Style ==
Kera is a women's garment worn with traditional Bhutanese attire. Women wear it with a skirt-type garment called Kira, while men also use it as a belt with a knee-length robe called Gho. Kera is folded several times in the warp direction and secured around the waist by tucking in the long warp fringe at one end. It serves as a belt and pocket or pouch to hold personal things. Kera is also a fashion statement now, but the younger generation wears Kera in a different style than older women.

== See also ==
- Chuba
- Toego
- Wonju
- Pathin
- Phasinh
- Rigwnai
