= Hajong =

Hajong may refer to:

- Hajong people, ethnic group in northeastern India
  - Hajong ethnic religion, their traditional religious practices
  - Hajong language, their Indo-Aryan language
  - Hajong marriage, their marriage ceremonies
