= Wedding of Jigme Khesar Namgyel Wangchuck and Jetsun Pema =

2011 Bhutanese royal wedding

- Jigme Khesar Namgyel Wangchuck and Jetsun Pema on their wedding day.
- Date: 13 October 2011
- Venue: Punakha Dzong
- Location: Punakha, Bhutan
- Participants: Jigme Khesar Namgyel Wangchuck; Jetsun Pema

The wedding of Jigme Khesar Namgyel Wangchuck, King of Bhutan, and Jetsun Pema took place on 13 October 2011 at the Punakha Dzong in Punakha, Bhutan. The current King of Bhutan, Jigme Khesar Namgyel Wangchuck, married Jetsun Pema, who became Queen Ashi Jetsun Pema Wangchuck. Both are descendants of the 48th Druk Desi of Bhutan and 10th Penlop of Trongsa, Jigme Namgyal.

== Engagement ==
Jigme Khesar Namgyel Wangchuck announced his engagement to 20-year-old Jetsun Pema during the opening of the seventh session of the Parliament of Bhutan on May 20, 2011.

== Ceremony ==
The royal wedding ceremony (Dzongkha: Gyal Tsuen Tashi Ngasoel) combined coronation and nuptials. Ahead of the ceremony, the betrothed received the blessings of the machhen (holy relic) of Zhabdrung Ngawang Namgyal. The traditional Buddhist ceremony began around 8:20 am, the time set by royal astrologers - when the king, wearing the royal yellow sash, walked into the courtyard of the 17th-century monastery in the old capital of Punakha and proceeded up the high staircase inside. A few minutes later, his 21-year-old bride arrived at the end of a procession of red-robed monks and flag bearers across a wooden footbridge over the wide, blue river beside the fort. The ceremony was held in two locations, one was presided over by the Je Khenpo for the Shabdrung Dag Nangma prayer, the other was attended by Dorji Lopon and 100 monks reciting Tshepa Mey prayers.

Raven Crown.

The King then received the Dar Na Nga, five silk scarves in the five auspicious colors, as well as the Raven Crown of the Wangchuck Dynasty. He then received another Dar Na Nga for his bride and bestowed it on her, along with the Phoenix Crown of the Druk Gyaltsuen.

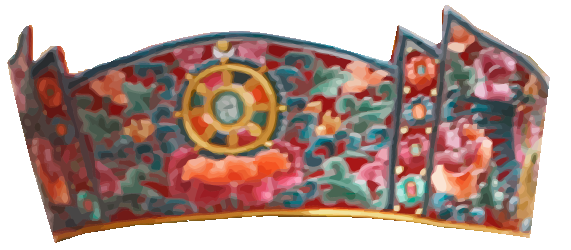
Phoenix Crown.

This was followed by a formal proclamation of Ashi Jetsun Pema Wangchuck as the Queen of Bhutan.

The proclamation was followed by the Tashi Ngasoel ceremony at the Grand Kuenra, again presided by the Je Khenpo. During this ceremony, the Je Khenpo chanted the Ngoedrup Langwa prayers for the accumulation of spiritual and worldly virtues. Following this ceremony, representatives of civil and religious authority presented the King and Queen symbolic gifts. At the conclusion of the ceremony, a traditional presentation of felicitations (Dzongkha: tashi lekdar) was followed by a public celebration in Punakha.

=== Venue ===
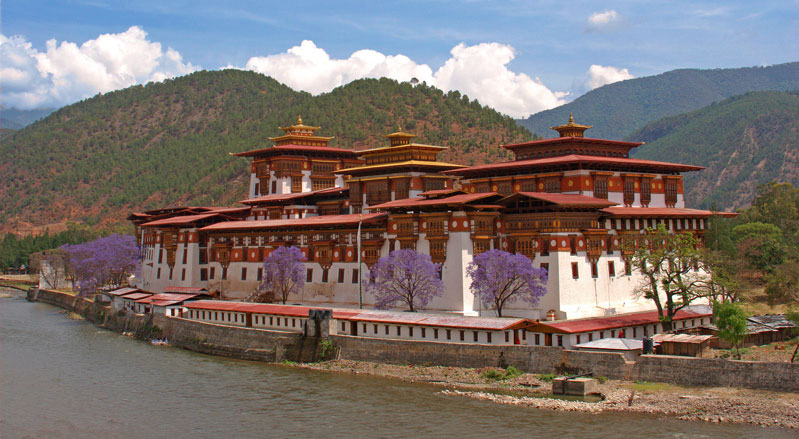
The Punakha Dzong in Punakha, where the wedding ceremony took place.

The main ceremony took place at the Punakha Dzong, meaning Palace of Bliss, the second largest dzong structure in Bhutan. The Punakha Dzong has served as a fortress and Buddhist monastery. The building, which can be accessed by a footbridge, has been renovated and repainted for the ceremony. The Punakha Dzong's gardens have also been replanted.

=== Wedding attire ===
The wedding featured traditional Bhutanese attire. The bride, Jetsun Pema, had ordered several elaborate kiras, the national dress for Bhutanese women, from among prominent weavers in the country. Jetsun Pema chose one of these kiras, which are woven from raw silk and can take months to complete, as her wedding kira. She wore a light yellow tego and a kira colored red, yellow, green and white, along with red earrings to match her red wonju, the colours are also symbolic of astrology.

The King wore a rose patterned yellow silk gho, the very same gho his father and grandfather had worn at their weddings.

=== Guests ===
The guests were predominantly members of Bhutan's royal family, the House of Wangchuck, government officials, friends of the royal family, and the press. There were no foreign royals or heads of state in attendance, however Indian dignitaries and ordinary Westerners were among the guests of the royal family. During the ceremony, family guests sat on one side of the hall, while tulkus and other high level officials sat on the opposite side. To prevent chaos, the dzong and its entrances were closed to the public.

Confirmed guests included:

- Rahul Gandhi, General Secretary of the Indian National Congress.
- Jigme Singye Wangchuck, former King of Bhutan and father of the groom
- Mayankote Kelath Narayanan, Governor of West Bengal
- Jyotiraditya Madhavrao Scindia, Indian Minister of Commerce and Industry
- Several Dutch delegates visited Bhutan and the Netherlands presented tulips to the royal couple.

== Public celebration ==
The Ministry of Home and Cultural Affairs declared 13–15 October 2011 a national holiday as part of wedding celebrations. Festivities on the wedding day featured traditional offerings song and dance, archery, a public luncheon of rice with scrambled eggs and potato (kewa datse), and congratulatory salutations (tashi lekdar) from public officials and ordinary onlookers who met the King and Queen face to face.

On 14 October, the King and Queen made their way from Punakha to Thimphu, where streets and buildings had undergone thorough repair and decoration with five-colored scarves, portraits of the royal couple, and lights to illuminate the city at night. Schoolchildren and townsfolk lined the main street of Thimphu as the King and Queen passed into town.

King Jigme Khesar Namgyel and Queen Jetsun Pema appeared at a public celebration held at the Changlimithang Stadium in Thimphu on 15 October 2011, three days after their wedding.

== Media coverage ==
The royal wedding and related celebrations is an unprecedented event in Bhutan. Dasho Kinley Dorji, Bhutan's Secretary of Information and Communications, told journalists that the royal wedding was Bhutan's largest media event in history, "We've not really done this before ... In fact, this is the biggest international media event we've ever had in Bhutan – ever." Approximately 160 foreign journalists and other members of the media arrived in the country to cover the wedding. The largest groups of journalists came from India and Thailand. The government bussed the foreign media in eleven mini-buses from their headquarters in Thimphu to Punakha, where the wedding took place.

Television only became available in Bhutan in 1999. Bhutan's state television broadcaster, Bhutan Broadcasting Service (BBS), launched its most extensive coverage ever conducted for an event.

== Hindu ceremony ==
On 17 October, the royal couple celebrated a Hindu marriage and was received by the head of the Hindu community (Hindu Samudaya), Dasho Meg Raj Gurung, and hundreds of Bhutanese Hindus. After exchanging garlands, lighting butter lamps, and offering prayers, the King and Queen received statues of Vishnu and Lakshmi, associated with royalty. In return, they donated money for a new Hindu temple near Kuenselphodrang and for the Hindu community of Bhutan.

== Honeymoon ==
The king and queen visited India soon after the royal wedding. The couple travelled through Rajasthan aboard a train chartered by the government of India. The King had previously visited Ranthambore, Rajasthan, in October 2010. The King and Queen followed this visit with a six-day state visit to Japan on November 15, 2011, where they were received enthusiastically by the Japanese people. The presence and conduct of the royals greatly impressed the Japanese people, especially the sight of the King offering prayers at the disaster areas following the March 11, 2011 earthquake in Japan.
