= Driglam namzha =

Bhutan's official code of dress and etiquette

The Driglam Namzha (Dzongkha: སྒྲིག་ལམ་རྣམ་གཞག་; Wylie: sgrig lam rnam gzhag) is the official code of etiquette and dress code of Bhutan. It governs how citizens should dress in public as well as how they should behave in formal settings. It also regulates a number of cultural assets such as art and architecture. In English, driglam means "order, discipline, custom, rules, regimen" and namzha means "system", though the term may be styled "The Rules for Disciplined Behavior".

== History ==
The Driglam Namzha traces its roots directly back to the 17th-century pronouncements of Ngawang Namgyal, the first Zhabdrung Rinpoche, a Tibetan lama and military leader who sought to unify Bhutan not only politically but also culturally. He established guidelines for dzong architecture, the characteristic monastery-fortresses of Bhutan. He also established many of the traditions of the tshechu "district festival" such as the Cham dance. The guidelines were intentionally codified to encourage the emergence of a distinctively-Bhutanese identity.

In 1989, the government elevated the status of the dress code from recommended to mandatory. All citizens were then required to observe the dress code in public during business hours. The decree was resented by some Lhotshampas in the southern lowlands, who complained about being forced to wear the clothing of the Ngalop people.

== Clothing ==
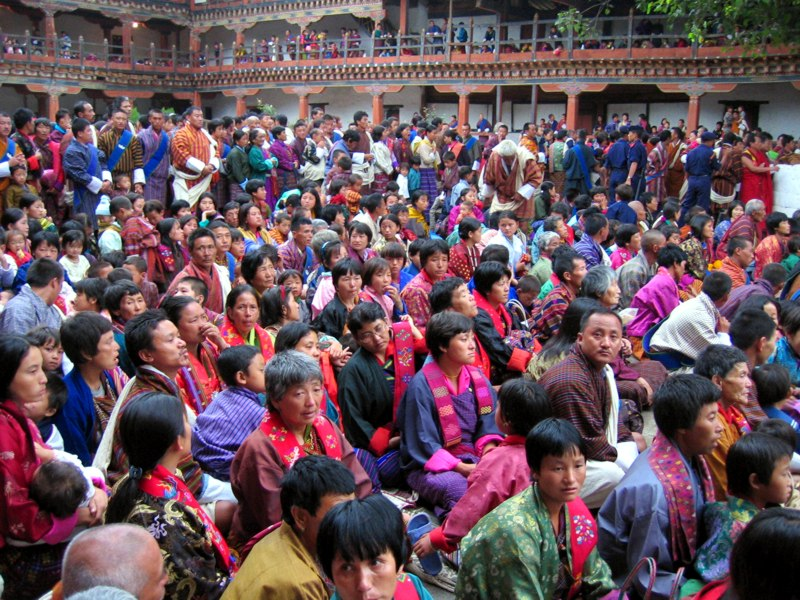
Bhutanese people in national dress.

Under the Driglam Namzha, men wear a heavy knee-length robe tied with a belt, called a gho, which is folded in such a way to form a pocket in front of the stomach. Women wear long-sleeved blouses called wonju made of silk, polyester, or lightweight cotton, over which they fold and clasp a large rectangular cloth called a "kira," thereby creating an ankle-length dress. A short silk jacket or toego may be worn over the kira. Everyday gho and kira are cotton or wool according to the season, patterned in simple checks and stripes in earth tones. For special occasions and festivals, varicolored, patterned silk kira, and, more rarely, gho, may be worn.

Additional rules apply when visiting a dzong or a temple, and when appearing before a high-level official. In such cases, Bhutanese will wear the national costume with ceremonial scarves. A white, raw silk sash with fringes called a kabney is worn by commoner men from the left shoulder to opposite hip, as other colors are reserved for officials and monks. Women wear a rachu, a narrow embroidered cloth draped over the left shoulder.

== Architecture ==
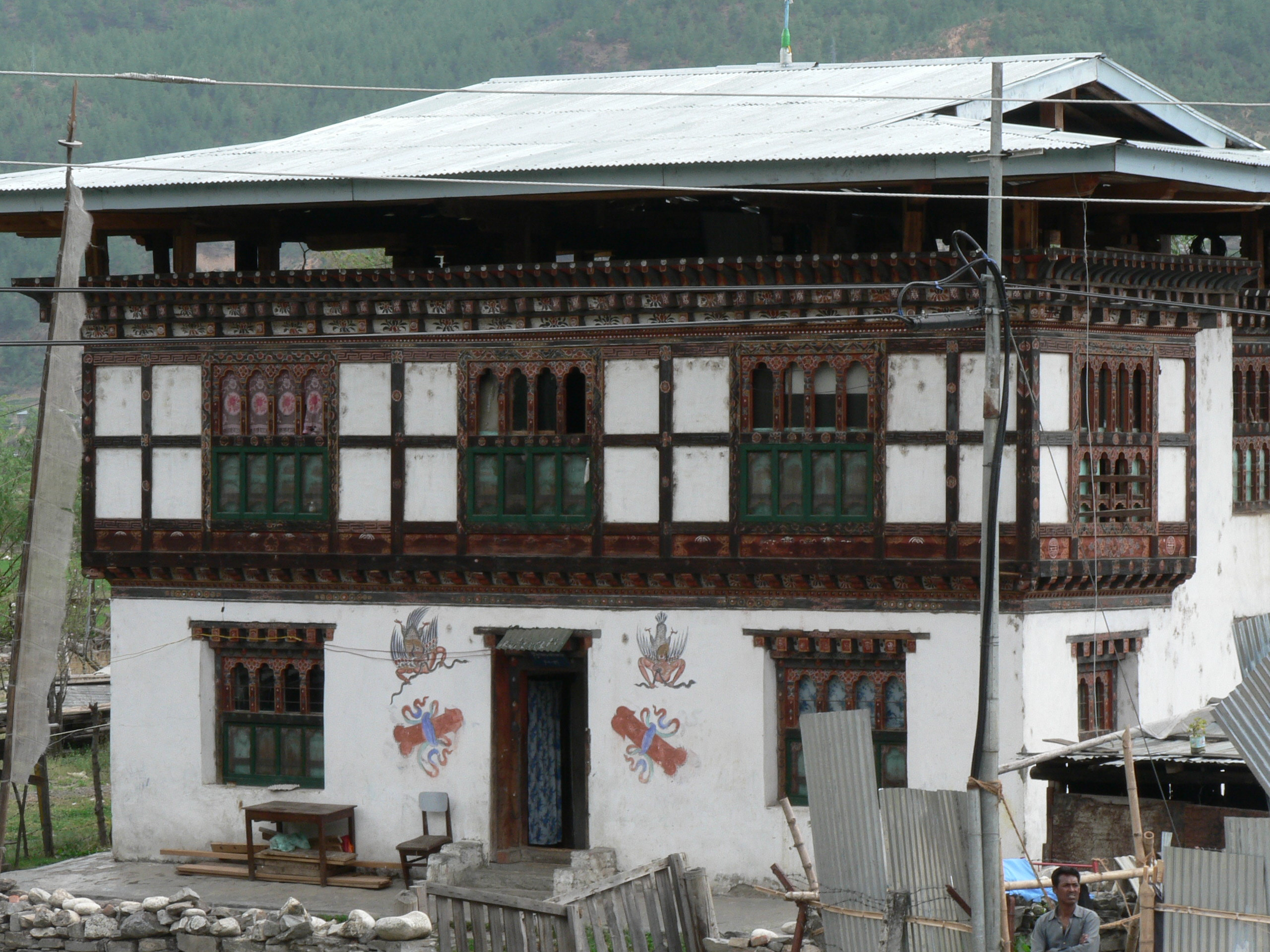
A Bhutanese house in Paro with varicolored wood frontages, small arched windows, and a sloping roof.

The Driglam Namzha codifies the traditional rules for the construction of the religious, military, administrative, and social centers of Bhutan, which are amalgamated into fortresses known as dzongs. No plans are drawn up nor are nails allowed in their construction. Under the direction of an inspired lama, citizens build dzongs as part of their tax obligation to the state. As recently as 1998, by decree, all buildings must be constructed with varicolored wood frontages, small arched windows, and sloping roofs.

== See also ==
- Culture of Bhutan
- History of Bhutan
- Dzong architecture
