= Hajong marriage =

Traditional Hajong marriage (Hajong Bhasa: Bya', pronounced as: [Bjɯ]) is a ceremonial ritual that involves a marriage established by pre-arrangement between families. Within Hajong culture, romantic love and widow re-marriage were allowed, and monogamy was the norm for the Hajong people.

== History ==
Hajongs are endogamous people. When intimacy develops between a boy and a girl without the knowledge of their parents, they are married to each other, provided that they do not belong to close maternal and paternal kinship. Exorbitant dowry system was absent in the Hajong society. The Hajongs would give a tolerable bride price or groom price called pon. Marriage is usually negotiated by the parents through a matchmaker known as Jahu or Jasu. Temporary shrines are set up in the yard, in front of which the wedding ceremony takes place. Four banana trees act as the pillars of the shrine, the shrine is decorated with paper cuttings with intricate motifs. Hajong marriages of the khutri or warrior class have a sword ritual to symbolise the mani katri, a sword given by a girl to her husband to protect her.

== Participants ==
In a traditional Hajong wedding there are different people who participate in the wedding ceremony:

- Kuina' and Damath, the bride and the bridegroom, both covered with a large white cloth known as the ghutang kapu. The white robes symbolize purity. Underneath the ghutang kapu, the bride wears a formal ekchapa pathin. Both, bride and the bridegroom, wear crowns. The groom's crown traditionally has a golden peacock on the top and he carries a small sword. The bride remains fully veiled.
- Airos are five or seven married women with their husbands alive. They perform the Chan-Bila Akawa, invite the deities to attend the wedding and bless the newly married couple and help the priest in performing the wedding.
- Dhunimao and Dhunibap ceremonially perform the marriage and act acts as the guardian in the wedding.
- Mita' is the formal witness the marriage and becomes a lifelong friend of the married couple.
- Udhika'ri is the priest who performs the formal marriage rites. The Udhikâri is now mostly substituted by a Hindu Brahmin.
- Gita'lus are people who sing songs that depict the marriage of Shib Dyao and Parbuti Dyao and story of Bihulâ and Lukkhindǒr.

== Traditional marriage rituals ==
=== Proposal ===
When an unmarried boy's parents find a potential daughter-in-law, they then go to the girl's house with a Jahu whose job is to assuage the conflict of interests and general embarrassment when discussing the possibility of marriage on the part of two families largely unknown to each other.

=== Bride price ===
At this point the bridegroom's family arranged the matchmaker (Jahu or Jasu) to present a bride price to the bride's family.

=== Arranging the wedding ===
Before the wedding ceremony, two families would arrange a wedding day according to Hajong calendar. Selecting an auspicious day to ensure a good future for the couple is as important as avoiding what is believed to be an unlucky day. The wedding is not held on the birthday of both the bride and the groom.

=== Invitation ===
The groom's family invites people like the Airos, Dhunimao and Dhunibap who are essential for performing the marriage rites. They are invited by giving betel nuts and betel leaves. Traditionally wedding ceremonies were held in the groom's house.

=== Wedding ceremony ===
The final ritual would be the actual wedding ceremony where bride and groom become a married couple, which consists of many elaborate parts and the rituals take place for three to five days:

==== Chan-Bila Akawa ====
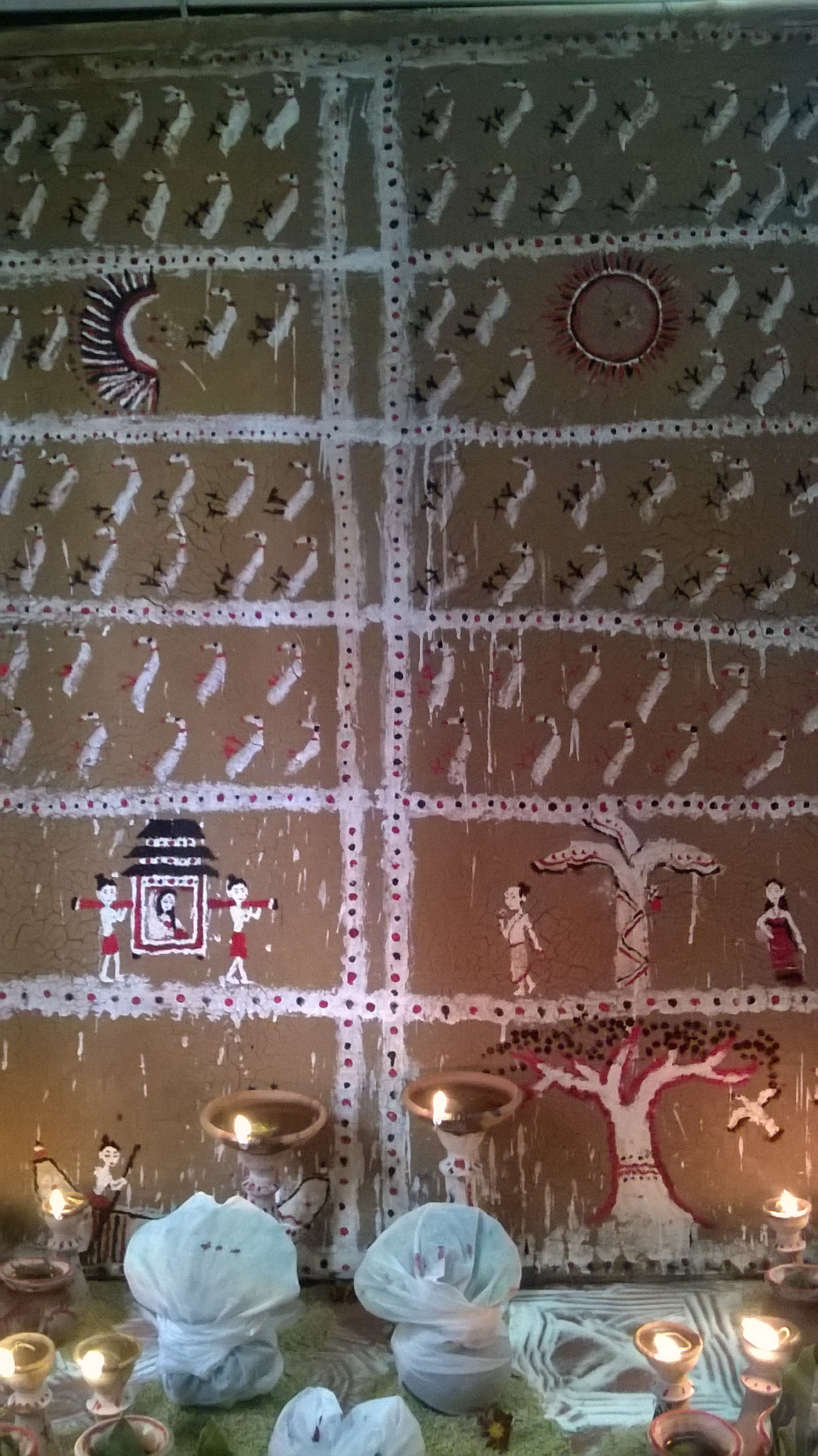
The actual wedding rituals start by making the Birapat-Chhita' during the Chan-Bila Akawa ritual.

The airos make sun, moon, birds and palanquins on a bamboo screen and paint auspicious symbols on earthen lamps and pottery.

==== Udhiba's ====
The airos ritually invite the gods, to attend the wedding and bless the newly married couple, by lighting a lamp in the name of the deity. Paper cuttings with elaborate designs are hung on the doors .

==== Wedding procession ====
The wedding procession from the bride's home to the groom's home consists of a traditional band and the airǒs. Picking the bride from her house, traditionally in a palanquin, the airǒs along with the jahu and the mitâ heads towards the groom's residence.

==== Welcoming the bride ====
The wedding procession stops at the door of the groom's home. There are ceremonies to be followed to welcome the groom and her wedding procession into the groom's home, which varies from place to place.

==== Gon Suwaba ====
The bride and the groom are ritually purified and a red thread is tied on their waists by the airos before the bhor bya'.

==== Bhor bya' ====
Bhor bya' is the actual wedding ceremony equivalent to exchanging vows in the west, it is an elaborate ritual and is held at the night. The couple would pay respect to wedding deities, the patron family deities, paying respect to deceased ancestors and the bride and groom's parents and other elders.

==== Basi bya' or Bahi bya' ====
It is the second half of the wedding and is performed in the next morning.

==== Wedding banquets ====
In Hajong society, the wedding banquet is known as Bi'â-khawa. There are ceremonies such as the bride and groom eating together and sharing the side dishes. Traditionally, the bride's father is responsible for the cost of the wedding invitation sweet treats, banquet invitations, and the wedding itself. Wedding banquets are elaborate and consist usually of 5–10 courses and turtle meat is considered auspicious for wedding banquets as it symbolizes long life. Traditionally, the father of the bride is responsible for the wedding banquet hosted on the bride's side and the alcohol consumed during both banquets. The wedding banquets are two separate banquets: the primary banquet is hosted once from the bride's side, the second banquet is at the groom's side, for which the groom's family takes the expenses of the banquet. While the wedding itself is often based on the couple's choices, the wedding banquets are a gesture of thanks and appreciation, to those that have raised the bride and groom (such as grandparents and uncles). It is also to ensure the relatives on each side meet the relatives on the other side.

== Polygamy ==
Polygamy is very rare among the Hajongs. Traditional Hajong culture does not prohibit nor explicitly encourage polygamy, except as a way to obtain male children.

== Remarriage ==
Widows are allowed to remarry in the Hajong society and this type of marriage is called Hang'a or Sang'a in Hajong. This marriage is mostly performed for young widows by their inlaws or the village headman.

== See also ==
- Hajong people
- Hajong Hinduism
