= Kabney =

Traditional Bhutanese silk scarf worn by males

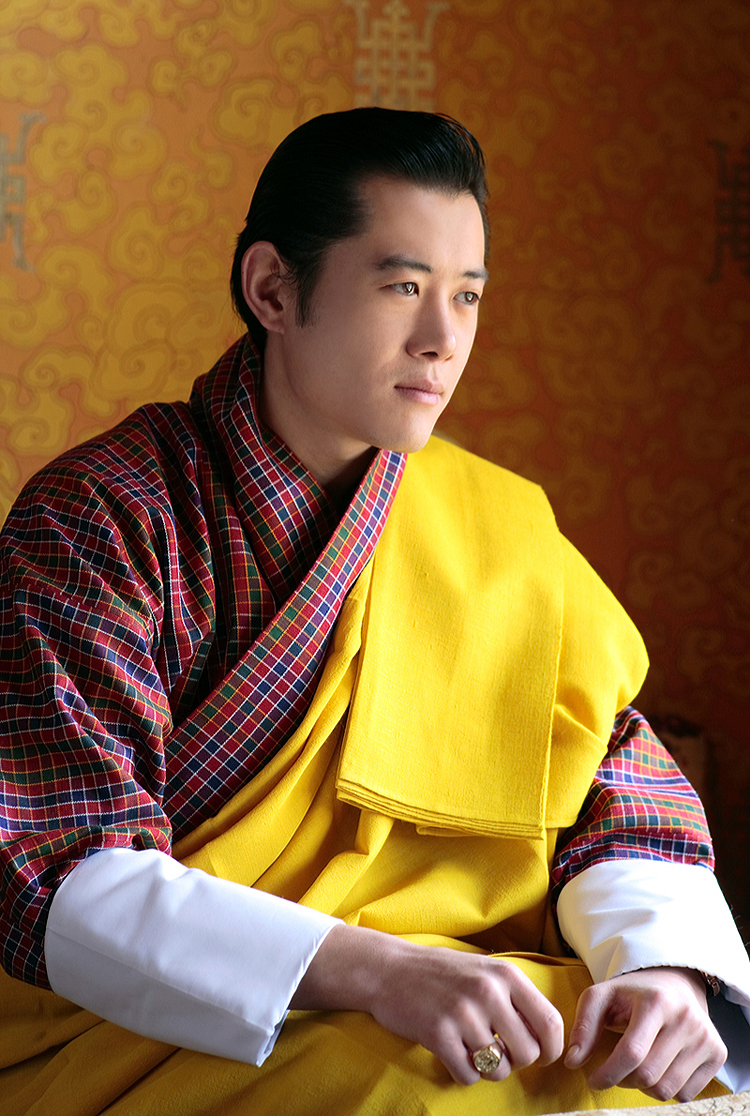
Ruling king Jigme Khesar Namgyel Wangchuck with saffron kabney (reserved for the Bhutanese king and chief abbot).

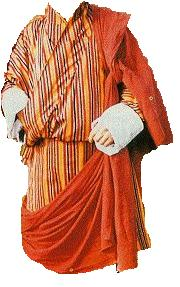
Gho with orange kabney.

A kabney (Dzongkha: བཀབ་ནེ་, Wylie: bkab-ne) is a silk sash worn as a part of the gho, the traditional male attire in Bhutan. It is raw silk, normally 90 cm × 300 cm (35 in × 118 in) with fringes. Kabney is worn over the traditional coat gho; it runs from the left shoulder to the right hip, and is worn at special occasions or when visiting a dzong. Kabney is also referred as Bura, which means wild silk.

The use of gho and kabney is encouraged in Bhutan as a part of driglam namzha (or driklam namzhak), the official code of etiquette and dress code of Bhutan. Gho is compulsory for schoolboys and government officials. The female traditional dress is called kira; a rachu is worn over the traditional dress kira.

The rank and social class of the bearer determines the permissible color of the scarf:

- Saffron sash for the Druk Gyalpo (king) and the Je Khenpo (chief abbot).
- Orange sash for Lyonpos (ministers and other members of the government).
- Red sash for Dashos (male members of the royal family and higher officials). The red scarf can also be conferred upon Bhutanese civilian, as it is one of highest honors a Bhutanese civilian can receive, and comes directly from the throne in recognition of an individual's outstanding service to the nation.
- Green sash for judges.
- Blue scarf for members of parliament.
- White sash without fringes for Secretary of various Ministries and Zimpoen to The King. Also awarded to distinguished individuals for various achievements and contributions.
- White sash with red stripes for Gups (headmen of the 205 gewogs).
- White scarf for ordinary citizens.

Former sash ranks include:

- White sash with blue stripes for Chimi (members of the National Assembly). This is now used for Thrompoens, the head of Thromde.
- Blue sash for Lodoe Tsoggde (members of the Royal Advisory Council, now defunct).
