= Kho (Bhutia dress) =

Traditional dress of the Bhutia people

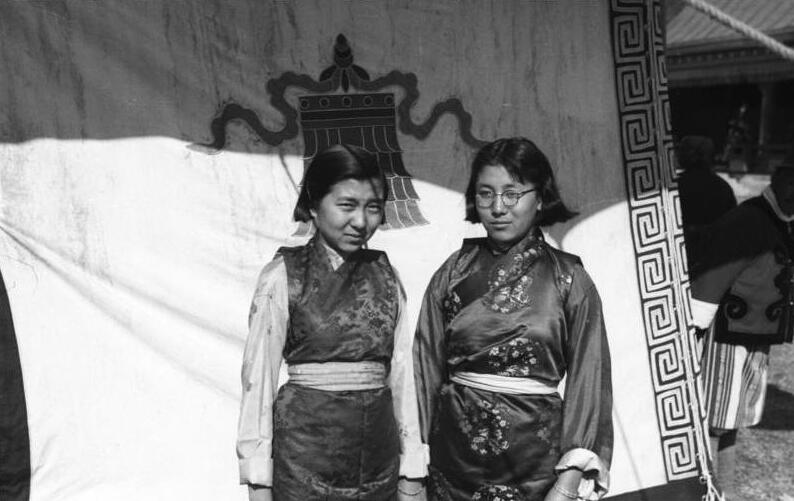
Daughters of chogyal Tashi Namgyal wearing kho (1938).

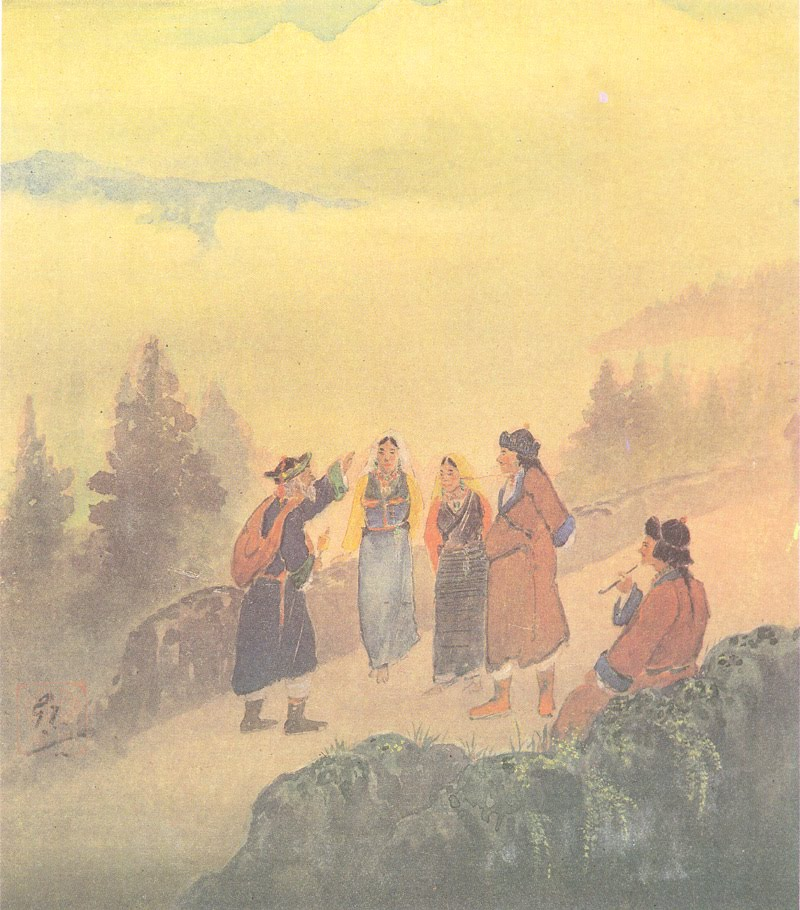
Storyteller, painting by Gaganendranath Tagore

The kho (Standard Tibetan: ཁོ) or bakhu the traditional dress worn by the Bhutias, an ethnic group native to the Indian state of Sikkim. It is a loose, cloak-like garment that is fastened at the neck on one side and near the waist with a silk or cotton belt similar to the Tibetan chuba and the Mongolian deel.

Women wear a full-sleeve blouse called a wonju inside the kho; a loose gown type garment fastened near the waist, tightened with a cloth belt.

== See also ==
- Gho
- Chuba
- Kira (Bhutan)
- Khada
