= Hajong ethnic religion =

The Hajong ethnic religion, also called Dyaoism, is the ethnic religion of the Hajong people of Northeast India, the fourth largest ethnicity in the Indian state of Meghalaya. The practice is a mixture of Hinduism and the animistic beliefs of the Hajong people. This sect of Hinduism includes worship of gods and deities of Hindu origin, demigods and spirits, all referred to as Dyao.

== History ==
The Hajong people have been practicing Hinduism since a long time. It is not known when the process of Hinduisation started. During the pre-Hindu period, among the Hajongs animism was the indigenous religion. As it was not seen to conflict with the rites of nature worship, Hinduism started to blend in with animism.

== Gods ==
Shiva (Shib Dyao), Vishnu (Bisnu Dyao) and Durga (Durgâ Dyao) or Kali (Kali Dyao) are the supreme gods. Other Hindu deities like Lakshmi (Lukkhi Dyao), Sarasvati (Sorosuti Dyao), Krishna (Krisno Dyao), Ganesha (Gones Dyao) are worshipped by the Hajongs. Along with the Hindu deities, a number of traditional deities are worshipped by the Hajong Hindus. Minor deities include disease causing spirits, river spirits and animal spirits. Hajongs are agrarian people, near the paddy fields animals like monkeys, elephants and foxes are offered rice and side dishes associated with each animal. The bastu group of deities also include a horse and an elephant. Hajong people also practice some of their traditional religious rituals. The Hajongs believe in some of the evil spirits like Machang Dyao, Jarang Dyao, Bhut, Muilâ Dyao, Jugni Dyao, Daini, etc. They adore and worship different gods and goddesses like Kali, Durga, Lakshmi, Saraswati, Kamakhya, Manasa, Basanti and others. Kartik puja among the Hajongs are known as Kâtkâ pujâ and Manasa puja is known as Kani Dyao puja.

== Clergy ==
There are two types of priests who perform the worship of the Dyaos (Gods, demigods or spirits).

=== Udhikâri ===
The Hajong equivalent of the Hindu Brahmin. They are Vegetarians and perform the wedding ceremonies. But now they are largely replaced by other Brahmins.

=== Dyaoshi or Nungtang ===
They are the shamans who perform all the worship of the village to appease the deities. A Dyaoshi is selected by Hil jaga or Barun jaga.

== Festivals ==
There are a number of Hindu and traditional festivals observed by the Hajong people. Pusnâ is a major harvest festival. A traditional festival is celebrated to honour the Bastu, Paabni and other group of deities. It is conducted by a Dyaoshi or Nungtang, a Hajong shaman. Bastu pujâ does not involve idol worship and is celebrated in a particular location outside the village premises. Another festival is called chormaga in Mymensingh and chorkhila in India. Chorkhila is celebrated during the month of October in South-West Garohills Districts of Meghalaya. During this festival, a group of young people go around from house to house in the village, or from village to village, playing music and performing folklores, sometimes stories from the Ramayana. The parties receive some rice or money in return for their performance. Since every person, young and old, comes out to watch the play, this is considered a chance to check out prospective brides and grooms. The Hajongs also celebrate their pre monsoon harvest festival known as 'Biswâ'. Kani pujâ, Kâtkâ pujâ, are also performed.

The Hajongs believe in some evil spirits like Machang Dyao, Jarang Dyao, Bhut, Muilâ Dyao, Jugni Dyao, Daini etc. They adore and worship different gods and goddess like Kali, Durga, Lakshmi, Saraswati, Kamakhya, Manasa, Basanti and others. They also practice some of their traditional religious rituals. Kartik puja among the Hajongs are known as Kâtkâ pujâ and Manasa puja is known as Kani Dyao puja. The day of Lakshmi puja is referred to as 'Kujâi Ghor' . In Bastu Pujâ tortoises and pigeons are sacrificed for Bastu.

=== Festivals observed by the Hajongs ===
Hajong Month	Festival	Associated Deity
Buisâk	Biswâ	-
Jesto	-	-
Asar	Âmâti Sata and Puilâ Rua	Kamakha Dyao
Srabon	Kani pujâ	Kani Dyao
Bhadro	Halduka	-
Asin	Kati Gasa	Kâtka Dyao
Kati	Kâtkâ Pujâ	Kâtkâ Dyao
Ugran	Nuya Khawa	Kani Dyao
Pus	Pusnâ and Dhan Dukâ	Bila Dyao
Mak	Bastu Pujâ	Bastu Deities
Phagun	Dol	Kani Dyao
Choitro	Biswâ	-

== See also ==
- Pusnâ
- Hajong people
- Hajong marriage
