= Architecture of Bhutan =

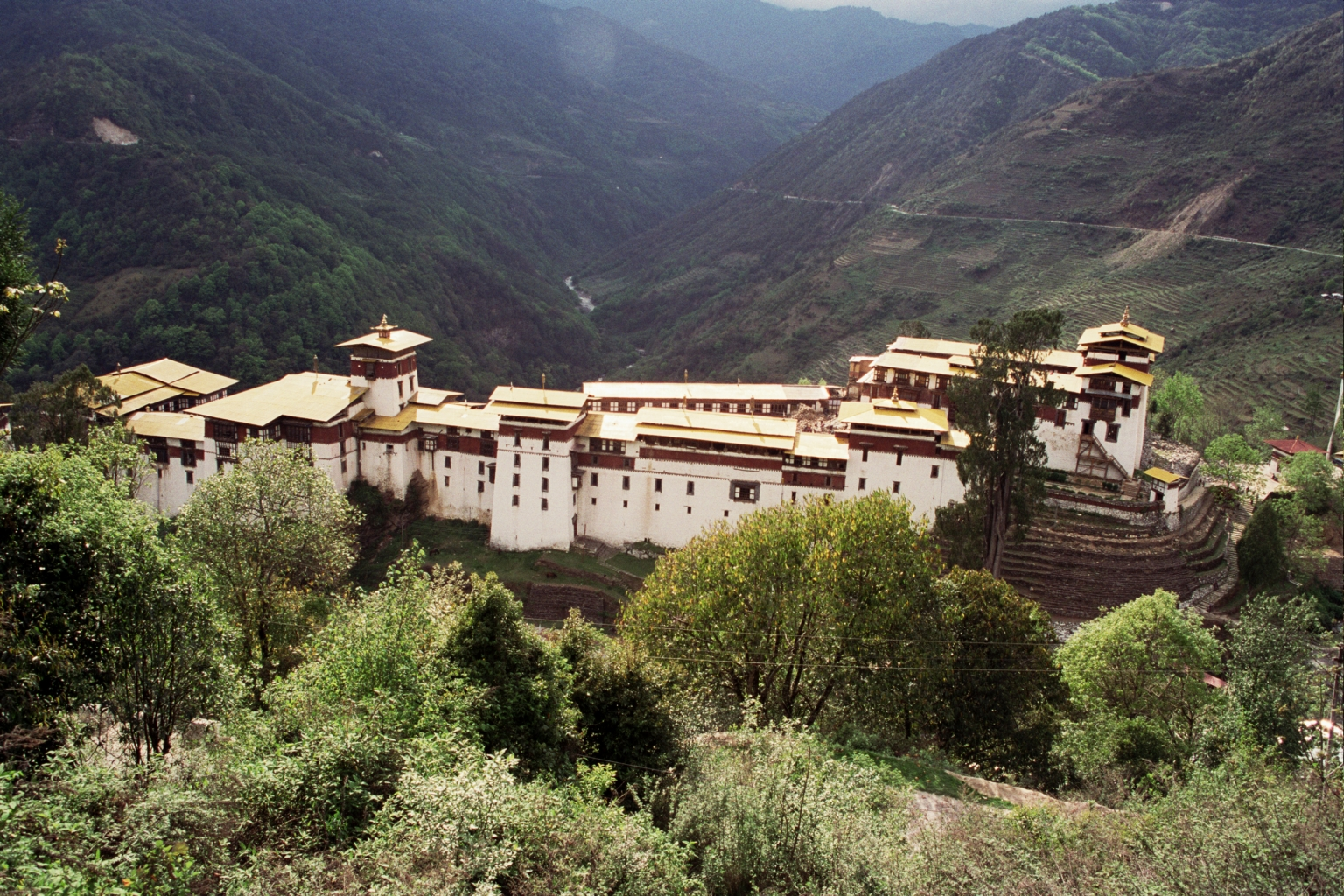
Trongsa Dzong, the largest dzong fortress Bhutan.

Bhutanese architecture consists of Dzong and everyday varieties. Dzongs in Bhutan were built as fortresses and have served as religious and administrative centers since the 17th century. Secular lordly houses emerged as a distinct style in the late 19th century, during a period of relative peace in Bhutan. Throughout its history, Bhutan has mainly followed the Buddhist architecture.

== Traditional architecture ==
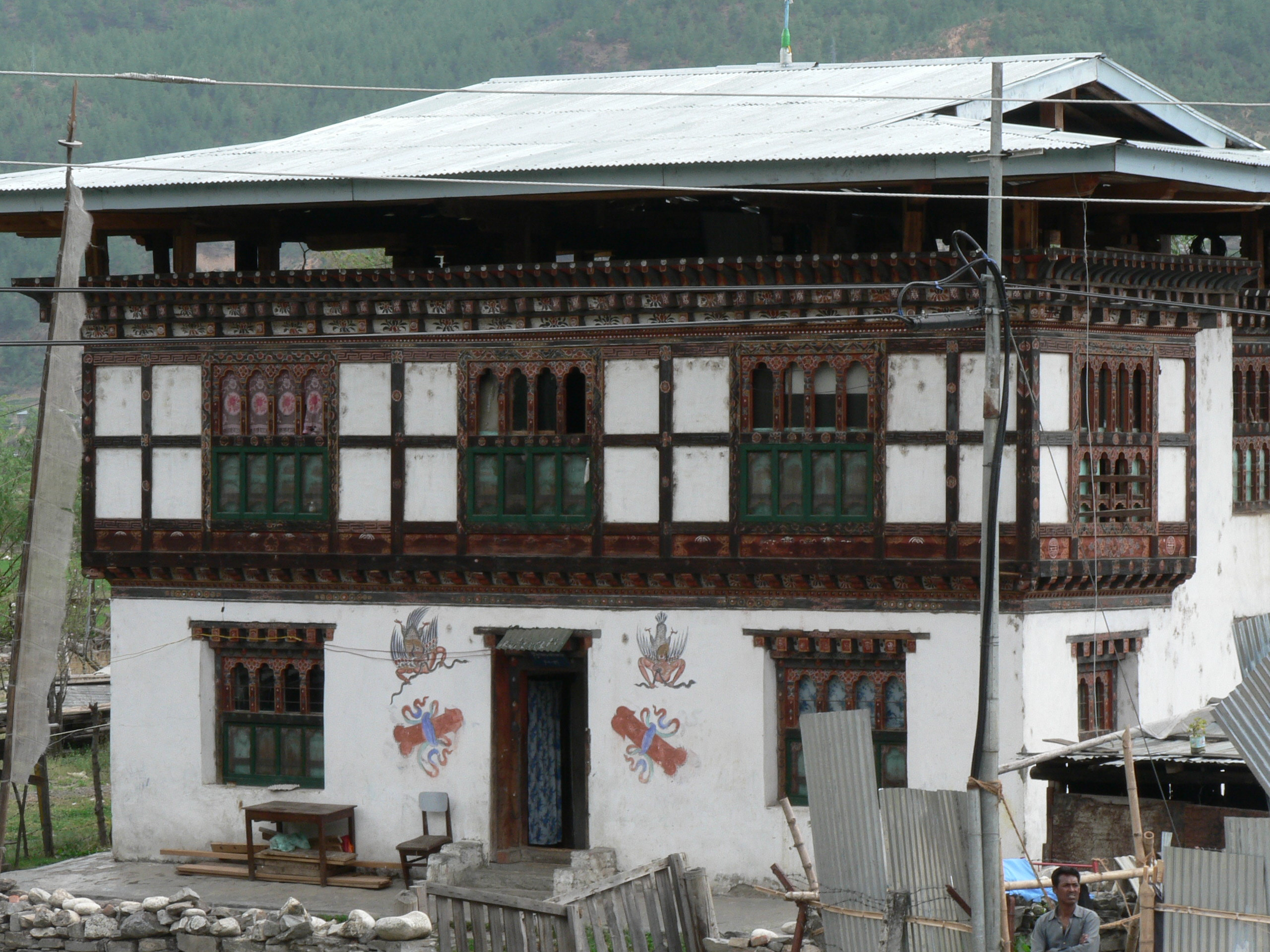
A Bhutanese house in Paro with multi-colored wood frontages, small arched windows, and a sloping roof

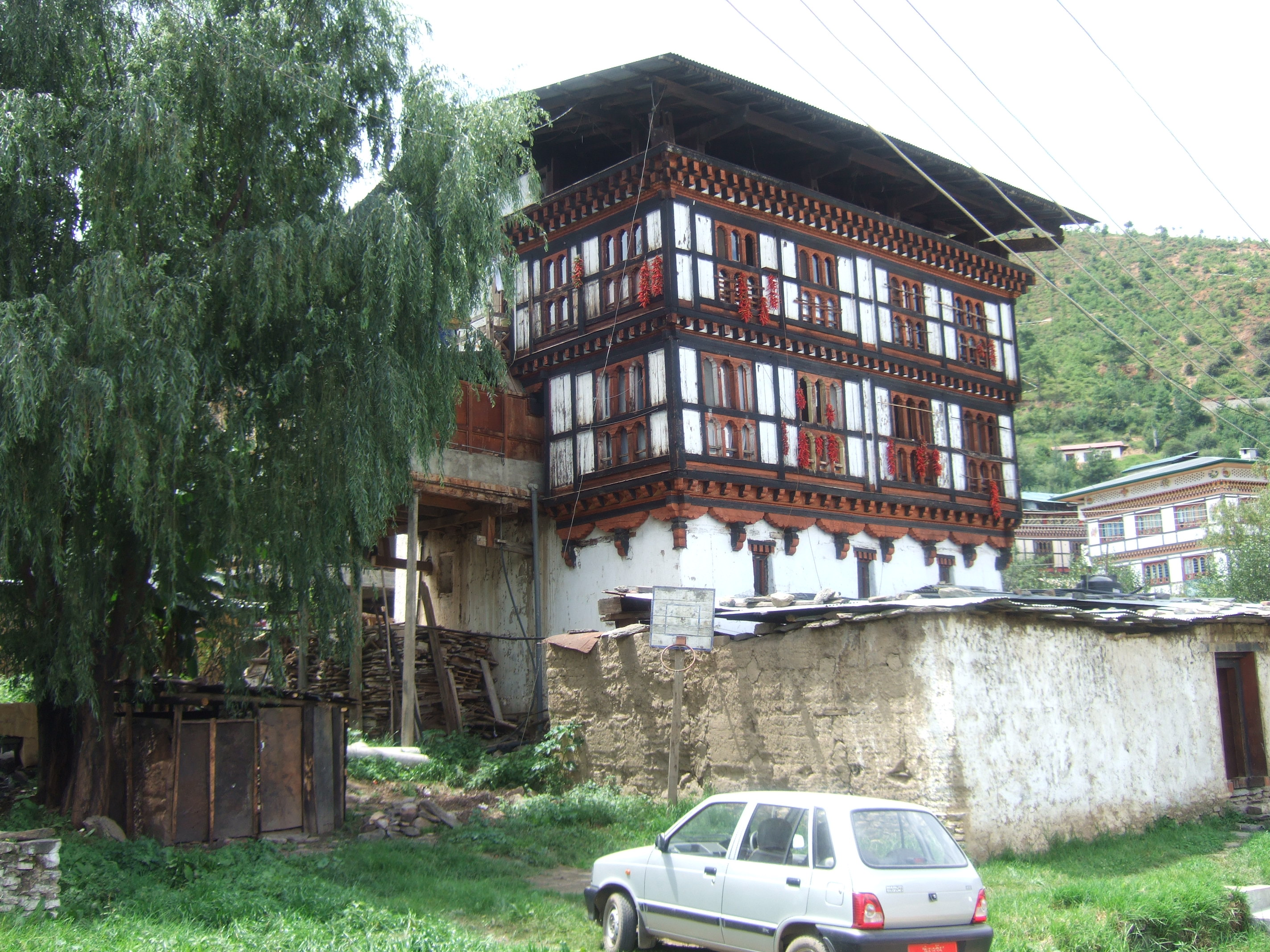
An old house in Kawajangtsa, Thimphu

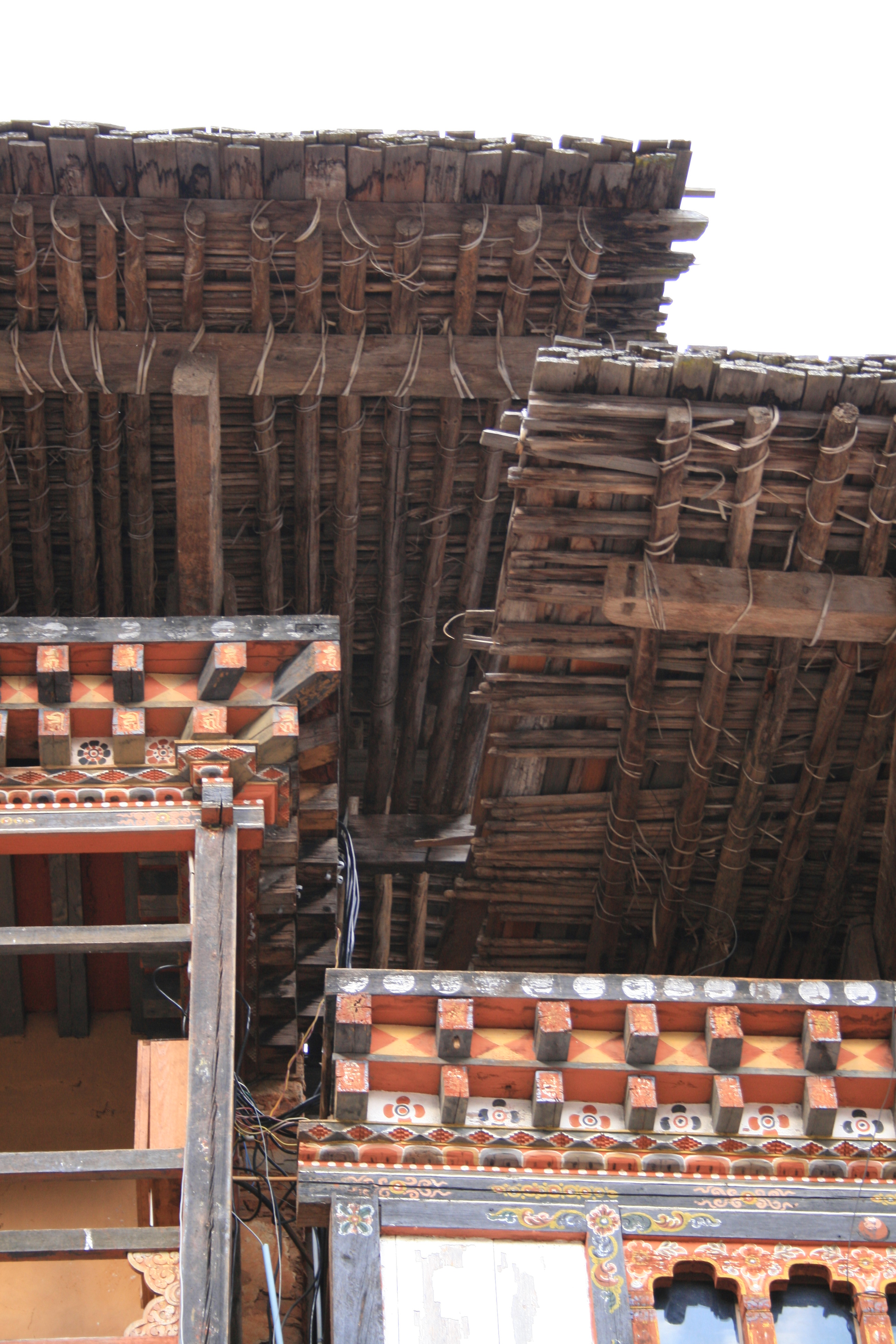
Roof construction at Trongsa Dzong

The Driglam Namzha codifies the traditional rules for the construction of the dzongs as well as ordinary buildings. Under the direction of an inspired lama the fortress is constructed by citizens who historically participated as part of their tax obligation to the state. Modernly, however, traditional structures are built by wage laborers, straining the government's ability to repair and preserve dzongs in particular.

Traditional architecture remains alive in Bhutan. As recently as 1998, by royal decree, all buildings must be constructed with multi-coloured wood frontages, small arched windows, and sloping roofs. Traditional western Bhutanese structures are often made from wooden frames earthen material, namely wattle and daub interior walls, rammed earth exterior walls, and stone and earth retaining walls. No plans are drawn up, nor are nails or iron bars allowed in the construction. Many traditional structures feature swastikas and phallic paintings.

Lordly mansions of western Bhutan (Bumthang, Paro, and Trongsa Provinces) appeared in the late 19th century during a period of relative calm. Like dzongs, they are multi-storied courtyard buildings, though homes have more windows, resembling somewhat chalets. Upper floors of residences usually served as chapels (choesum) that housed paintings, statues, and religious literature.

The architecture of ordinary houses varies according to location and elevation. In the southern lower altitudes, thatched bamboo houses are common; buildings progress to simple stone structures in higher altitudes. Two-storied buildings resembling but smaller than the lordly mansions are common throughout western Bhutan. Like mansions, upper floors are often reserved for chapels, which double as guest quarters. Attics, insulated with bamboo mats and hay, often serve for drying animal skins and chilies.

As with most buildings, walls of ordinary homes in the west are most frequently rammed earthen walls, pounded into wooden frames for up to a week and rendered with lime. Completed mud walls may be left naturally colored or whitewashed.

The wetter eastern valleys of Bhutan tend to be steep, narrow ravines, with settlements dug directly into mountainsides. Walls are more often made of stone in these regions, as opposed to the rammed earth more prevalent in the west.

Doors of Bhutanese homes usually have a tongue-and-groove design, hinged on a pair of wooden pegs. Generally, smaller windows are built into lower floors, with larger windows on upper levels to add to structural soundness. Windows are most often decorated with a curved trefoil (horzhing) motif. Sloping, wooden-shingled roofs are pitched but lack rain gutters; there is a growing trend toward metal shingles for their durability. Traditional roofs are adorned by a wooden cornice. There is usually a large space left between the roof and walls for air to pass.

Interior stairs are cut from single trunks when possible.

== Dzong architecture ==
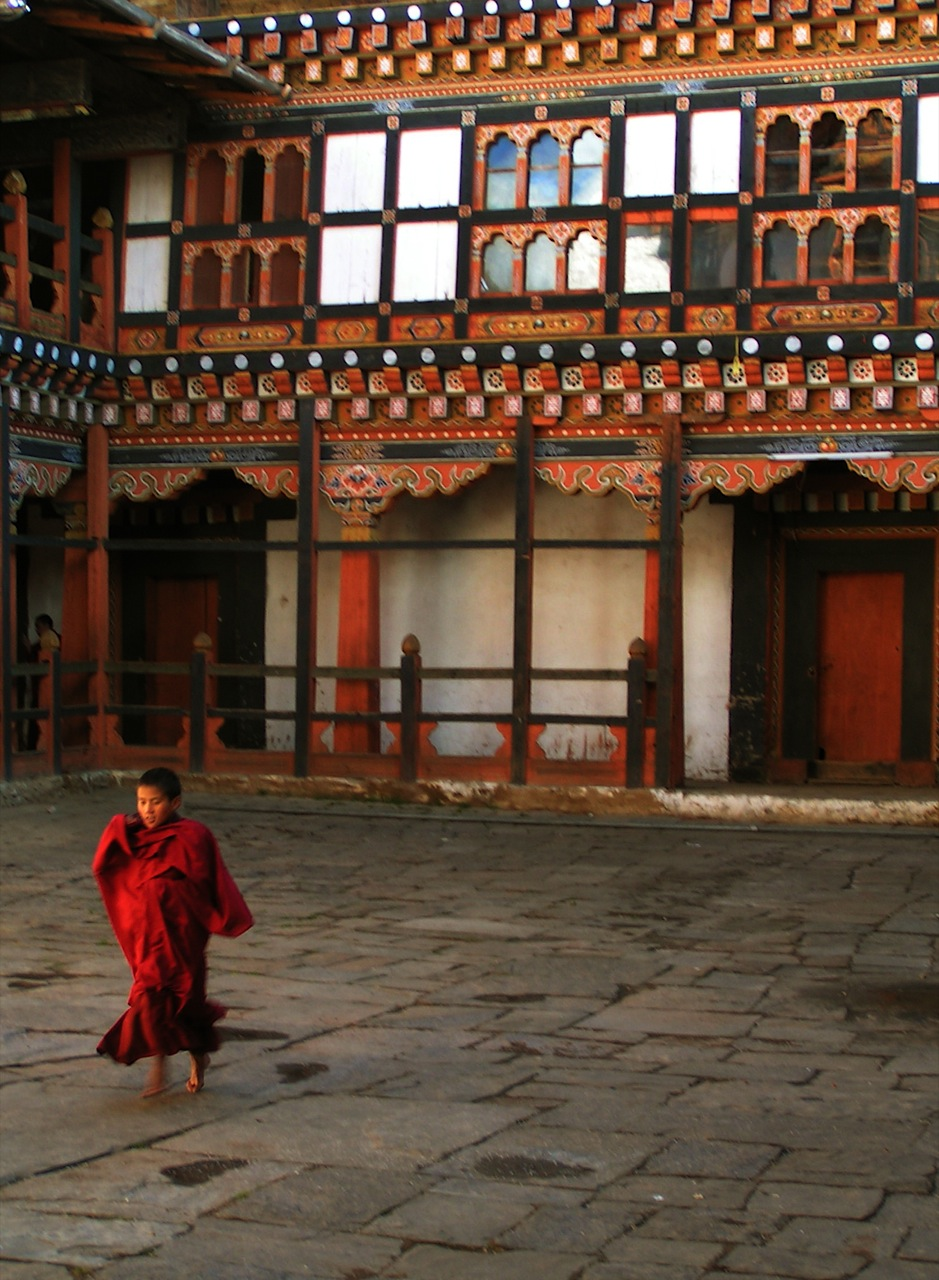
Courtyard of Trongsa Dzong

Bhutanese dzong architecture reached its zenith in the 17th century under the leadership of the great lama Ngawang Namgyal, the Zhabdrung Rinpoche. The Zhabdrung relied on visions and omens to site each of the dzongs. Modern military strategists would observe that the dzongs are well-sited with regard to their function as defensive fortresses. Dzongs were frequently built on a hilltop or mountain spur, or adjacent to important streams.

Dzongs comprise heavy masonry curtain walls surrounding one or more courtyards. The rooms inside the dzong are typically allocated half to administrative function (such as the office of the penlop or governor), and half to religious function, primarily the temple and housing for monks. This division between administrative and religious functions reflects the idealized duality of power between the religious and administrative branches of government.

== Religious architecture ==
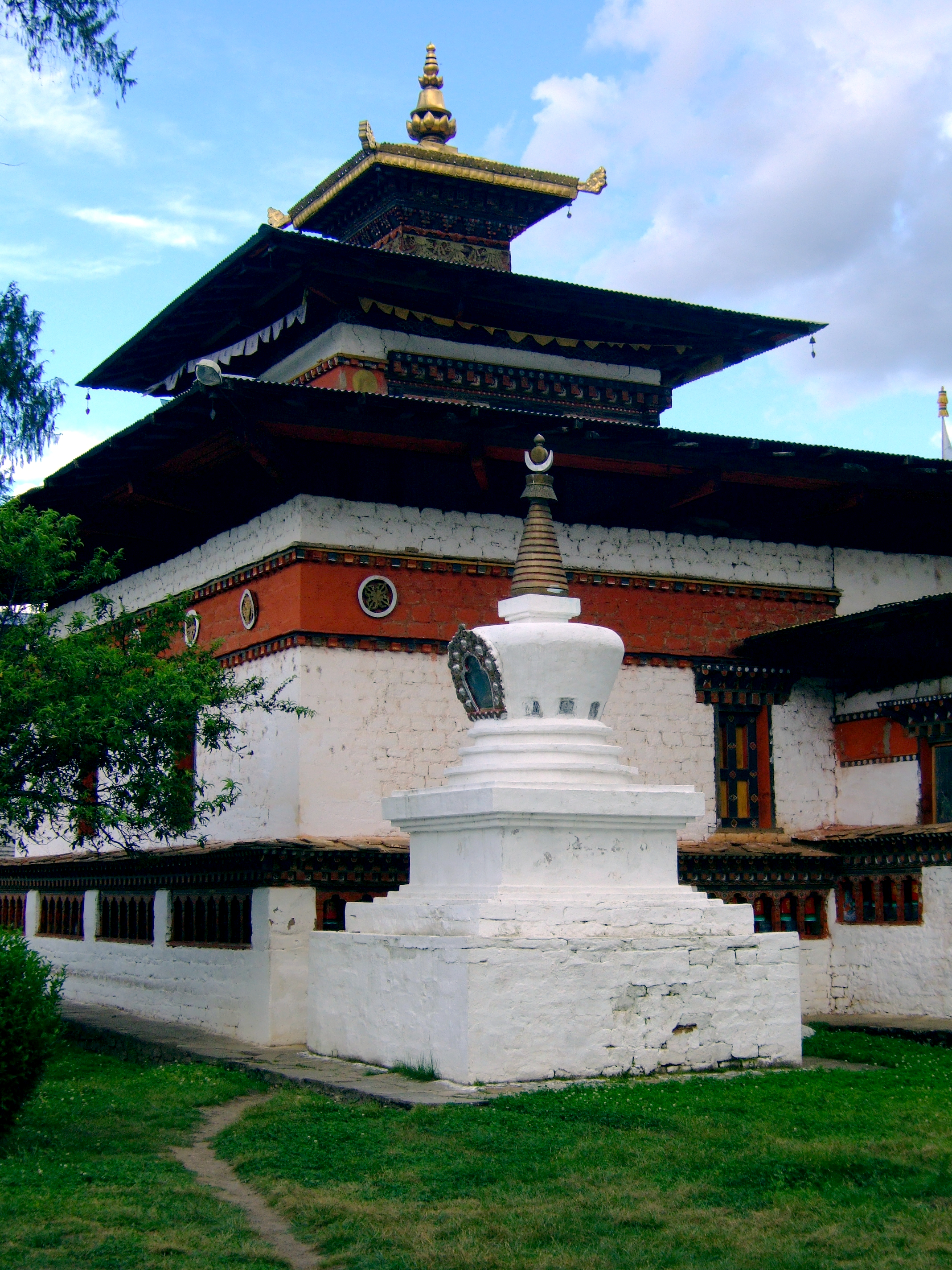
Kyichu Lhakhang and chorten, Paro

Buddhist temples (lakhang) in Bhutan are often relatively simple single-story structures surrounding a courtyard. Most also feature high thresholds. They are often adorned with a red stripe along the upper walls, and gilded copper roofs. There is sometimes an antechamber at the entry.

Internal walls and congregation halls of Bhutanese temples are decorated with painted and appliqué frescoes and murals. Religious themes predominate, especially the life of Buddha, the legends of Guru Padmasambhava, and protective deities.

Monasteries (gonpa, goenpa) follow two architectural traditions: cluster and dzong. Cluster types seem to present the oldest tradition of monastic architecture in Bhutan, in which one or two temples is surrounded by clusters of housing for its monks.

Chortens, receptacles of worship akin to stupas, dot the land. Pilgrims and locals circumambulate chortens in order to gain merit. Larger Bhutanese domed chorten are hewn of stone and whitewashed in the Nepalese style. Smaller flared chortens in Tibetan style are found in eastern and central Bhutan, often accompanied by a protective wooden superstructure. The native Bhutanese style is a square stone pillar with a khemar near the top, sometimes accompanied by a ball and crescent to depict the sun and moon. This indigenous style represents a kind of reduced form of the classical stupa. Yet another style of chorten is supported on two pillars, under which people pass to gain merit.

== Bridges ==
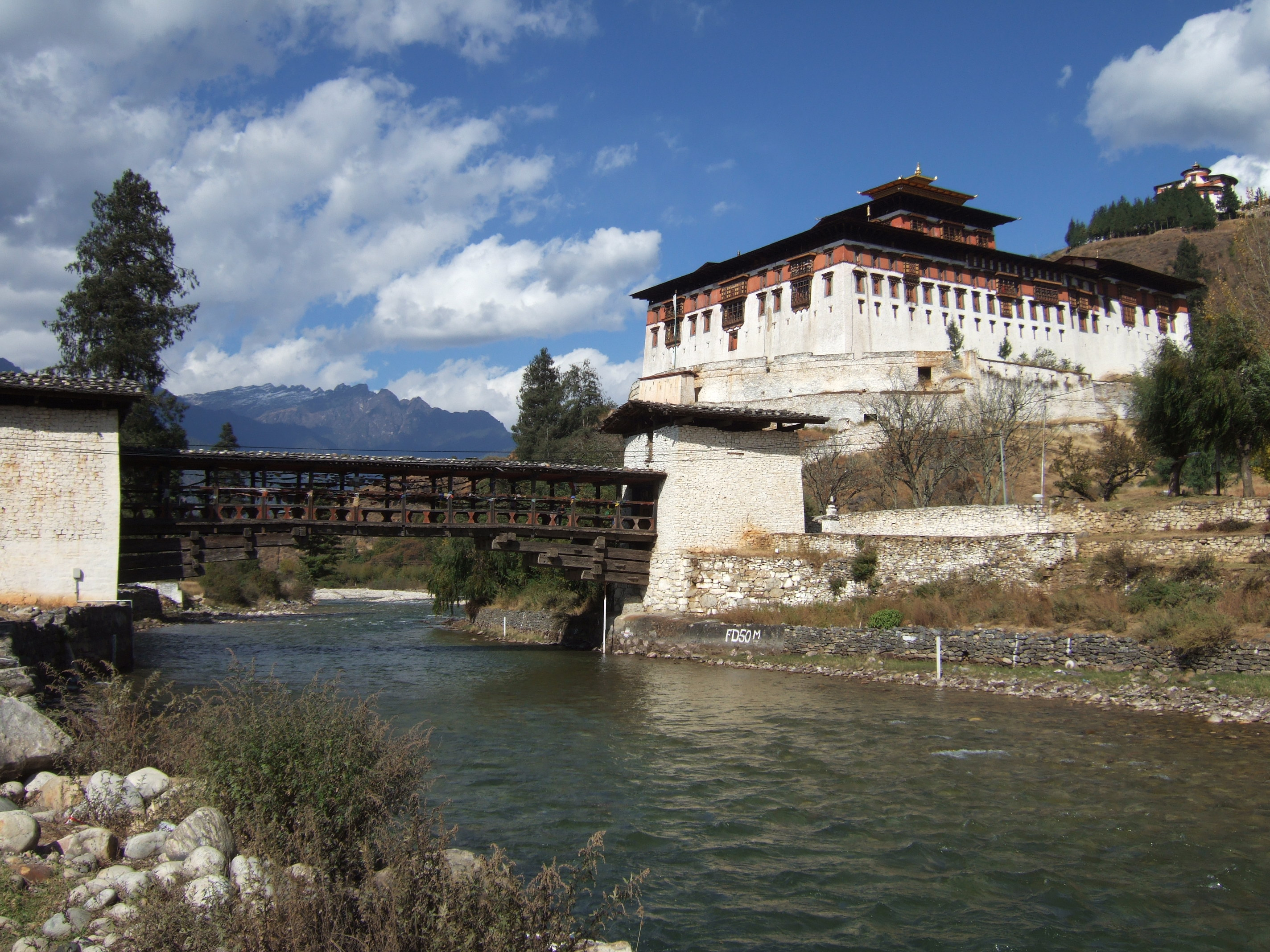
Cantilever bridge over the Pa Chhu at Paro Rimpung Dzong

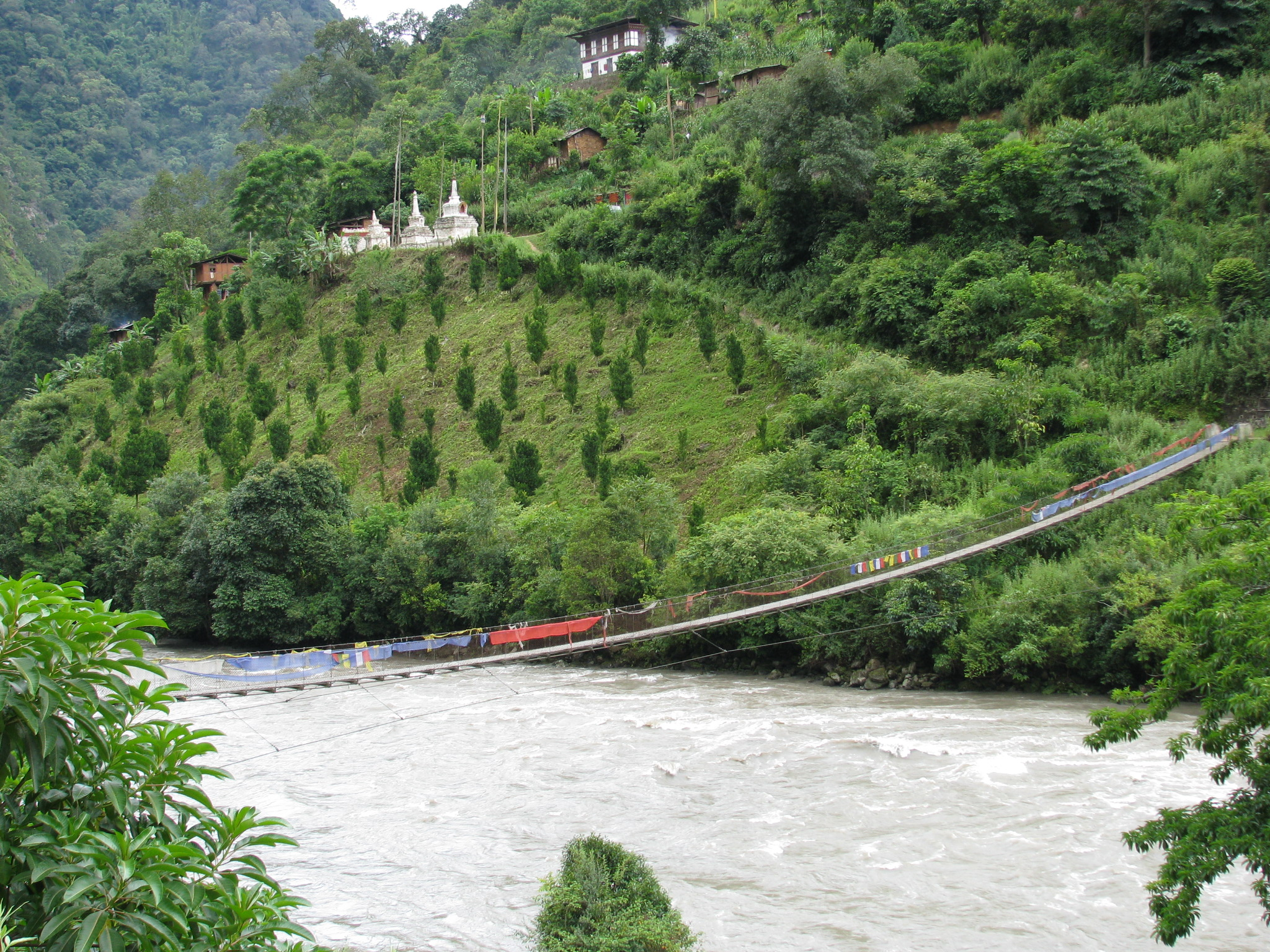
Suspension bridge over the Kuri Chhu

Mountainous Bhutan has always relied on bridges for travel across its many steep ravines and rushing rivers prone to disastrous flooding. The most traditional bridges of Bhutan are its cantilever bridges, however the kingdom also has several large suspension bridges.

Bhutanese cantilever bridges are aggregations of massive, interlocking wooden structures that form a single bridge. These ancient bridges have supported centuries of human, animal, and increasingly industrial traffic.

== See also ==
- Dzong architecture
- Driglam Namzha
- Architecture of Tibet
