= Toego =

Short jacket-like garment worn over a kira by women in Bhutan

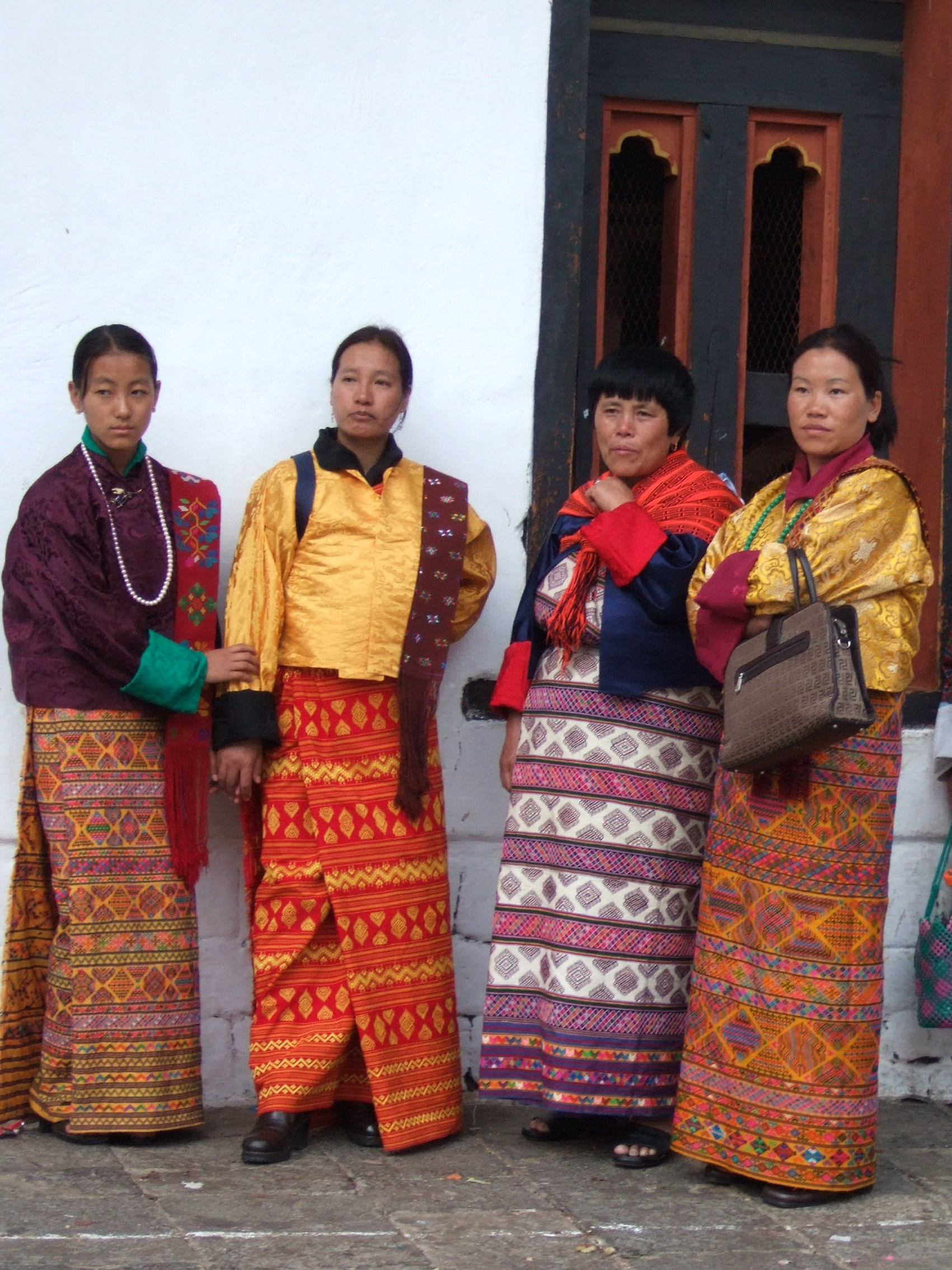
Bhutanese women wearing kira with tego

A toego or tego (Dzongkha: སྟོད་གོ་, Wylie: stod go; Roman Dzongkha: tög°o. Sometimes also romanised tögo) is a long-sleeved, short jacket-like garment worn over a kira by women in Bhutan. The toego is thus part of the national dress of Bhutan required by the driglam namzha along with the kira, the wonju and the rachu.

Both women and men in Bhutan wear the tego under the gho and over the kira.

== See also ==
- Kho (costume)
- Chuba
- Khata
- Tibetan culture § Clothing
