= Agrun =

Traditional garment for Hajong women

- Type: Shawl
- Material: Silk, Cotton
- Place of origin: India
- Manufacturer: Hajong people

An Agrun (also called Agron, Argon or Agon) is a traditional shawl-like garment worn by Hajong women in the Indian subcontinent, in modern-day India and Bangladesh.

It is a form of festive wear, worn during special occasions. Agrun are used by both men and women. They are shuttle-woven and characterized by large-scale, symmetrical patterns, featuring geometrical shapes and stylized leaves and flowers in colored silks with or without gold and silver threads. Traditionally argons used to be very large in size and would have birds like herons, ducks and peacocks, and trees like kadamba tree brocaded on them.

== See also ==
- Pathin
- Dupatta
- Sabai
- Hajong people

== Sources ==
- Endle, Sidney (1911). The Kacháris. Macmillan and Co.
