= Pusnâ =

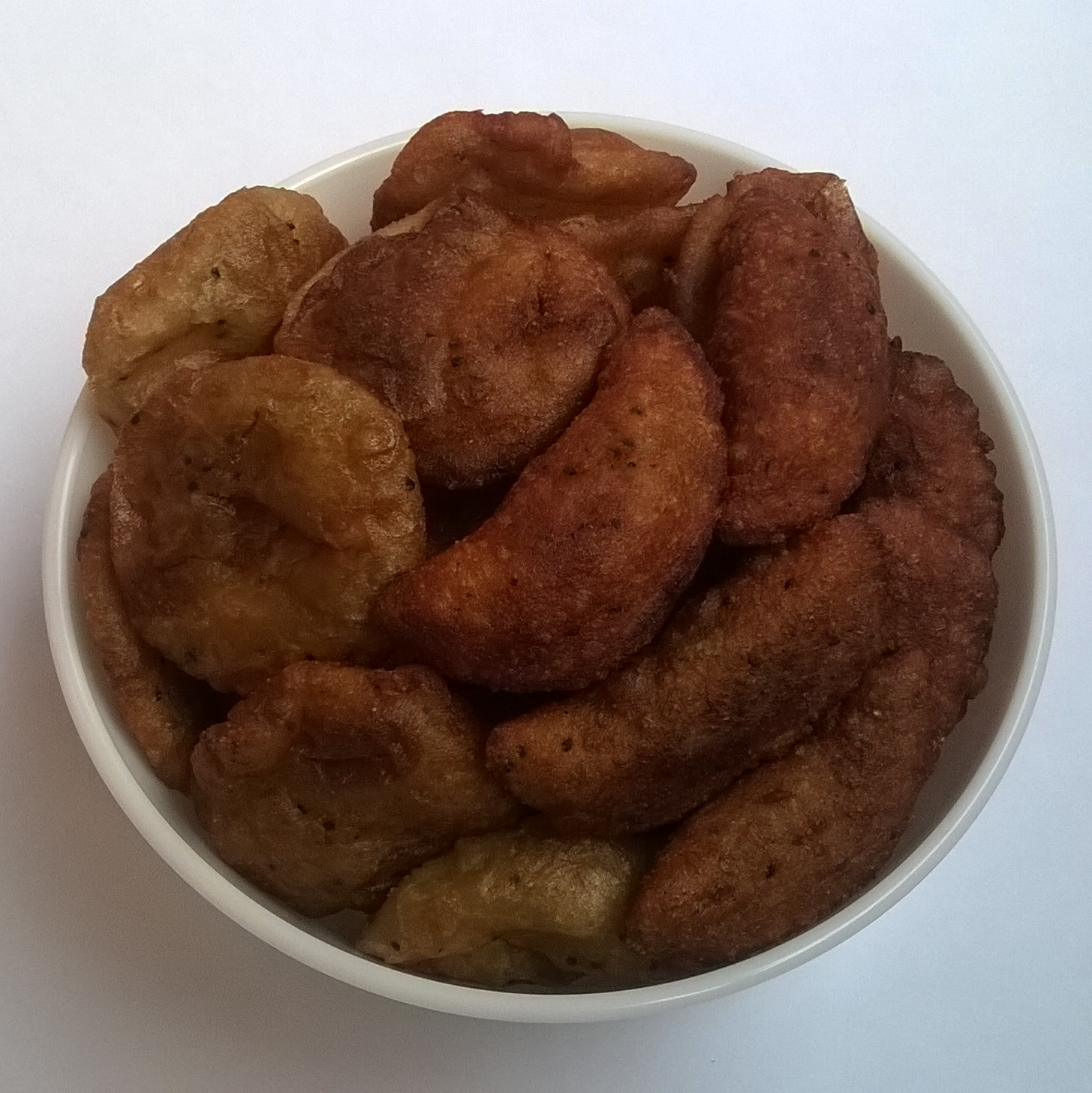
- Rice cakes eaten during Pusnâ. The round ones are called Tel Pi-thâ and the rice cake shaped like the half-moon are stuffed with sesame seeds and jaggery and are called Chore Pi-thâ, literally meaning rooster rice cake.
- Also called: Spring Cake Festival
- Observed by: Hajong people
- Type: Cultural
- Significance: Marks the arrival of spring
- Celebrations: Making and eating of glutinous rice cakes and rice wine
- Observances: Visiting relatives and friends, ancestor worship, honouring the Sun, harvest feasts with rice cakes and rice wine
- Begins: A day before the Sun begins its movement away from the Tropic of Capricorn
- Frequency: Annual
- Related to: Thingyan, Sangken

Pusnâ is one of the most important festivals celebrated by the Hajong people on or around January 14. In 2016, the festival falls on January 15. Pusnâ is a solar event making one of the few traditional Hajong festivals which fall on the same date in the Gregorian calendar every year, that is January 14, with some exceptions when the festival is celebrated on January 13 or 15. It is the celebration of Sankranthi, with feasts lasting for a week. Traditionally, Pusnâ is also a time for the family to get together. One activity that occurs during these get-togethers is the making and eating of Pi-thâ. Pi-thâs are made of glutinous rice flour.

== Traditional customs ==
During pusnâ people prepare different kinds of traditional cakes with ground rice, scraped coconut, banana and juice extracted from Palmyra palm. Some of these rice cakes are deep fried, and some are steamed in bamboo or banana leaves. Ancestors are honoured on the first day of Pusnâ. People visit their relatives and friends during this festival.

== See also ==
- Hajong ethnic religion
- Hajong people
