= Pathin =

Wrap around

- Type: Wrap, Skirt
- Material: Silk, Cotton
- Place of origin: India

Pathin is a wrap-around skirt worn by the women of the Hajong tribe of the Indian subcontinent in Northeast India and Bangladesh. It covers the upper and lower part of the body from the bust until the calf of the leg. Women in the upper class wore a long pathin which would fall down to the floor while women in the lower class wore a shorter pathin whose length reaches to the ankle.

The pathin is a horizontally striped, colourful, rectangular piece of cloth with alternate symmetric layers of different colours between red stripes and thick horizontal borders called chapa. Pathins are woven in traditional looms known as 'Sipni Bana' and 'Sal Bana'. It is operated with hands and does not require the use of feet. Pathins are also used to make mekhelas in Assam.

== See also ==
- Dhoti
- Kira (Bhutan)
- Rignai
- Argon (clothing)
