= Gho =

Knee-length robe; national dress of men of Bhutan

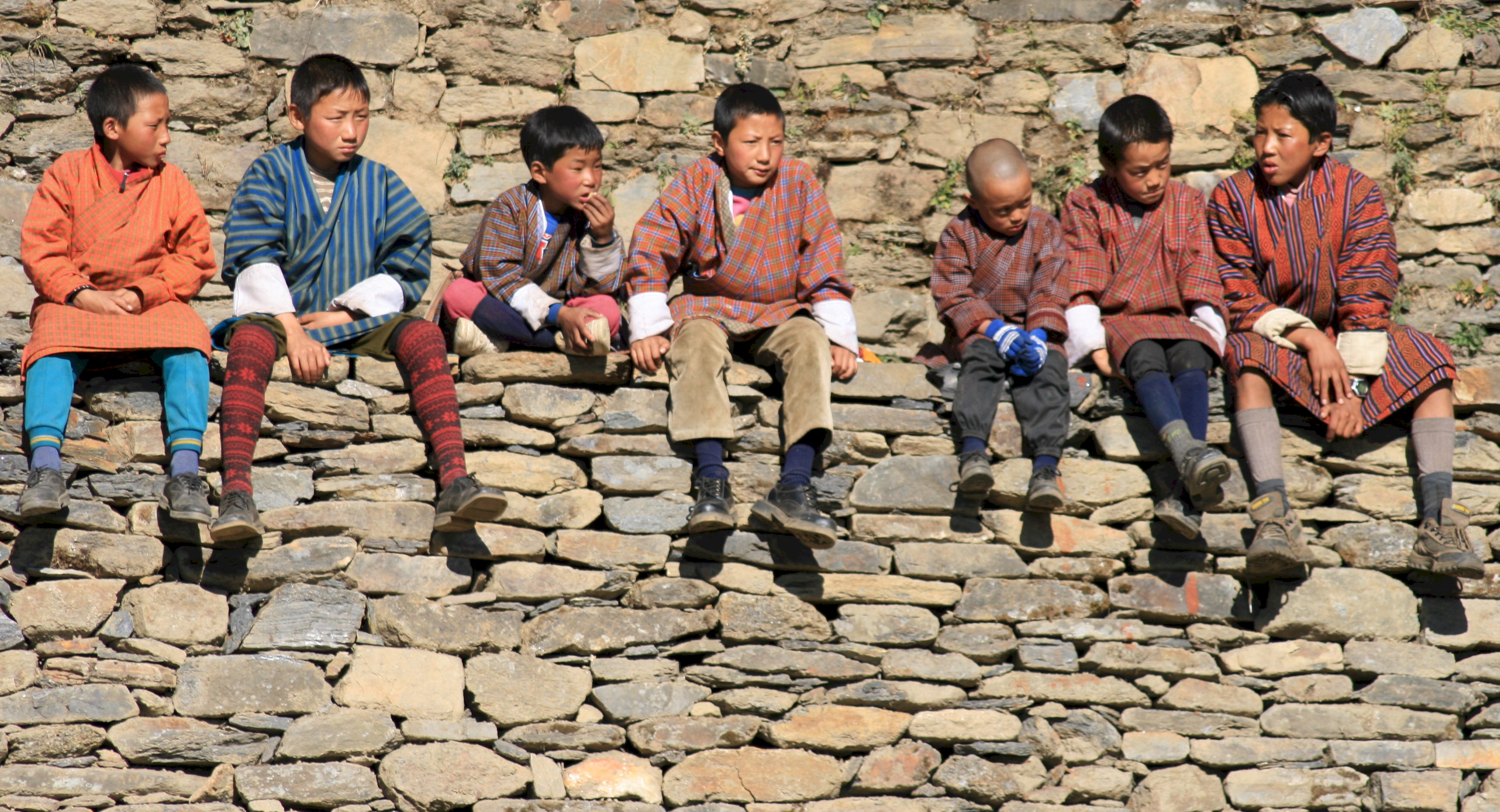
Bhutanese boys wearing gho at a festival in Punakha, November 2006

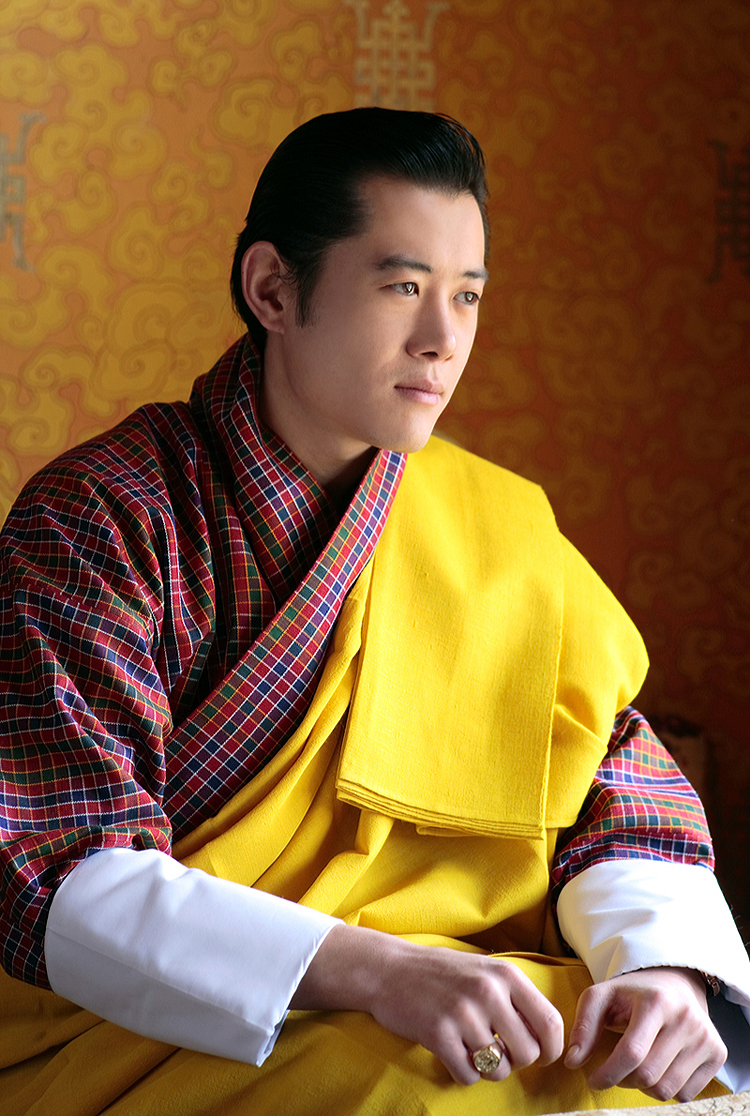
Jigme Khesar Namgyel Wangchuck, Druk Gyalpo of Bhutan, wearing a gho and royal saffron kabney

The gho or g'ô (Dzongkha: བགོ་, Dzongkha pronunciation: [ɡ̊oː˨]) is the traditional and national dress for men in Bhutan. Introduced in the 17th century by Ngawang Namgyal, 1st Zhabdrung Rinpoche, to give the Ngalop people a more distinctive identity, it is a knee-length robe tied at the waist by a cloth belt known as the kera (Dzongkha: སྐེད་རགས་, romanized: sked rags). On festive occasions, it is worn with a kabney.

The government of Bhutan requires all men to wear the gho if they work in a government office or school. Men are also required to wear the gho on formal occasions. In its modern form, the law dates from 1989, but the driglam namzha dress code is much older.

The traditional dress for men is the gho, a knee-length robe tied with a handwoven belt, known as kera. Under the gho, men wear a tego, a white jacket with long, folded-back cuffs.

In the film Travellers and Magicians by Khyentse Norbu, the main actor Tshewang Dendup wears a denim gho. This unique blue jean gho was made from eight metres of denim and is believed to be the only denim gho in existence. This is one of many varieties of the gho depicted in Bhutanese film.

== See also ==
- Kira
- Toego
- Kabney
- Kho (costume)
