= Chuba =

Long woolen coat worn by Tibetan people

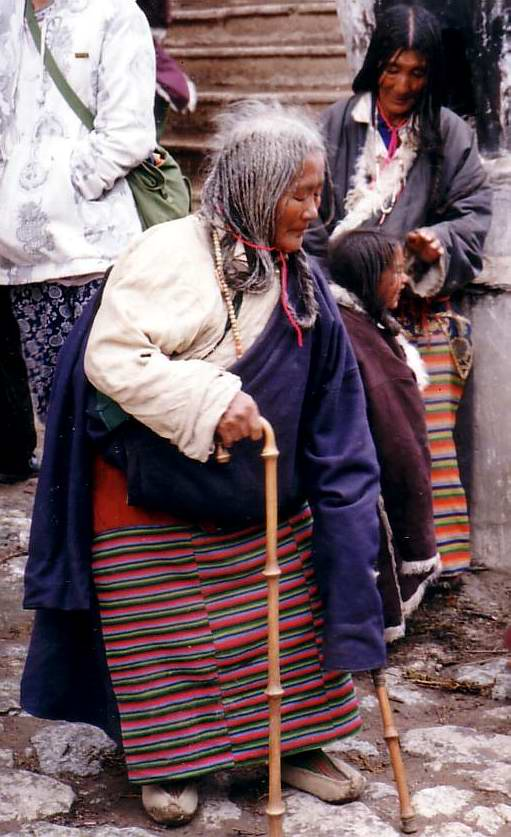
Elderly pilgrim wearing a chuba, Tsurphu, Tibet

A chuba (Tibetan: ཕྱུ་པ་, Wylie: phyu pa, THL: Chuwa), also called a chhupa, is a warm ankle-length unisex robe worn in Tibet and by members of the Tibetan diaspora. It is worn with the left side wrapped over the right and bound around the waist by a long sash. The design and material of the chuba varies across Tibetan communities and the climate and season it will be worn in.

== Textiles and design ==
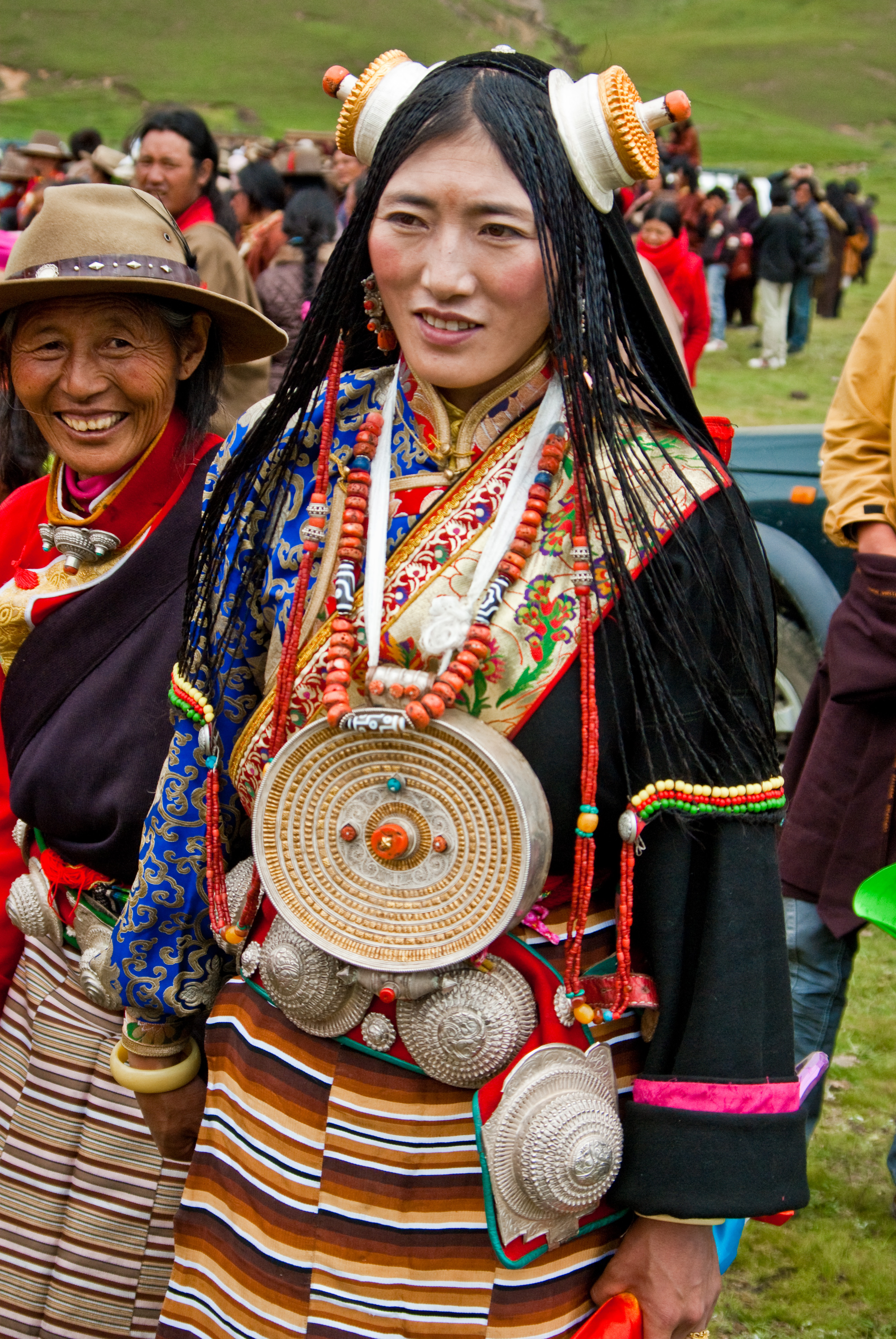
Young woman wearing a decorated chuba

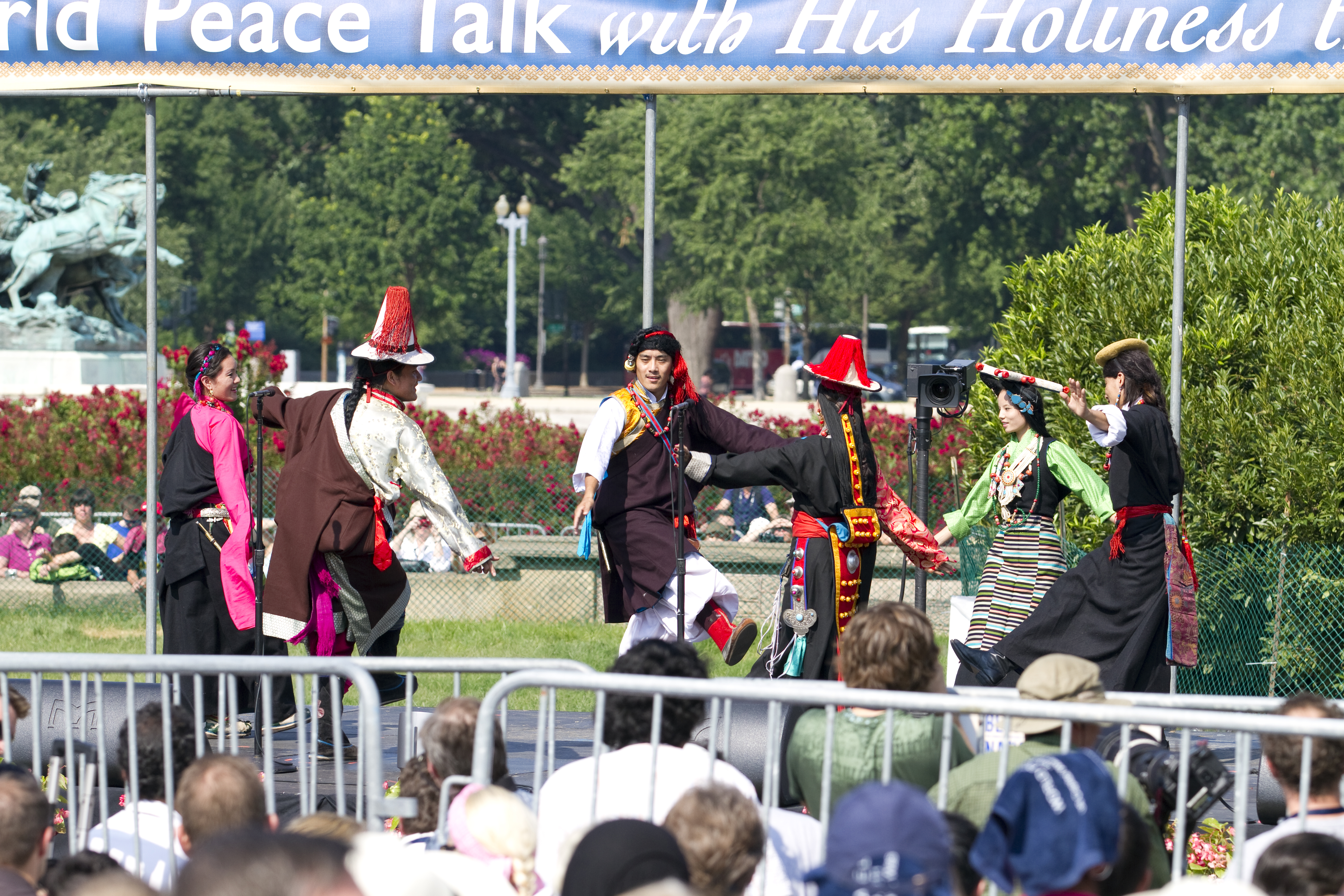
Tibetan dancers performing

Chuba vary in patterns and textiles depending on where the person is from and their background. A variety of textiles may be used, including:

- Pulu, a woven wool fabric
- Inner sheep fur
- Lambskin
- Sheepskin
- Cotton
- Silk

Chuba are often decorated with black or colorful cloth along the hems or at the cuffs of the sleeves, which may indicate social statuses such as gender, whether the wearer is married, or the community the wearer is from. As in many cultures, more decorative clothing with bright colors and expensive materials is often worn for celebratory occasions.

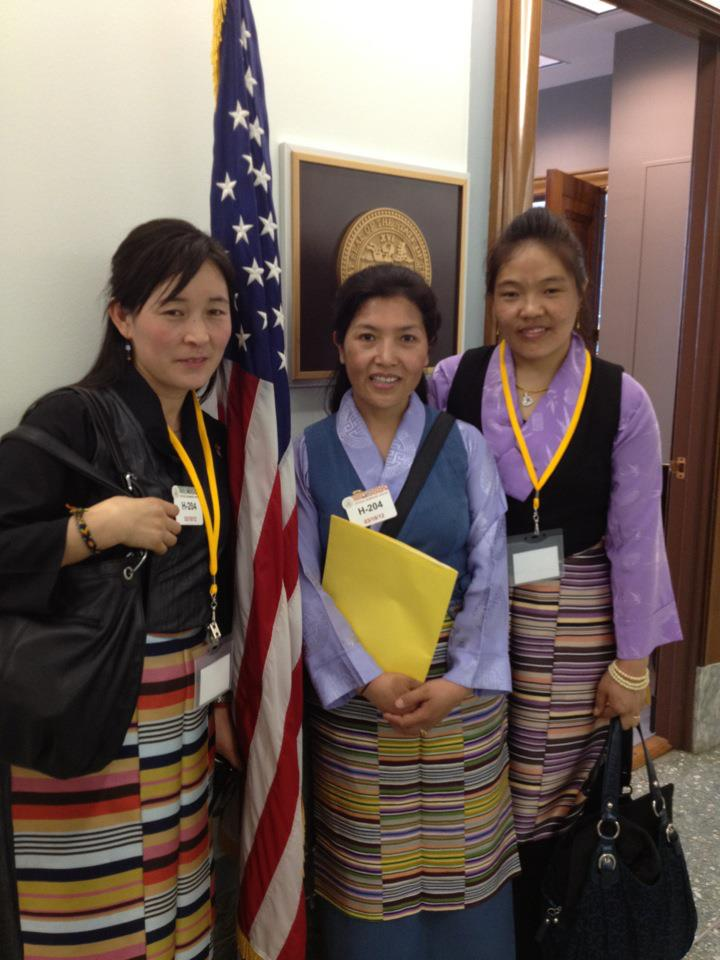
Tibetan women wearing a chuba

Beginning in the 1600s, otter pelts were used for clothing meant for special occasions. The pelts were expensive, and they were usually only used for decorations such as trim. They were also used to make hats. Lighter furs were considered to be more desirable than black furs.

Ethnologist Michel Peissel, discussing his experience wearing a chuba, described it as difficult to put on but "one of the most amazing and efficient garments ever invented". The sleeves are long to keep the hands warm, and the extra length of the body is pulled over the belt and used as a large pocket. In warm weather, one or both sleeves can be shrugged off the upper body. It is worn over a shirt and sometimes trousers, and married women wear a colorful apron called a pangdhen on top.

== Social aspects ==
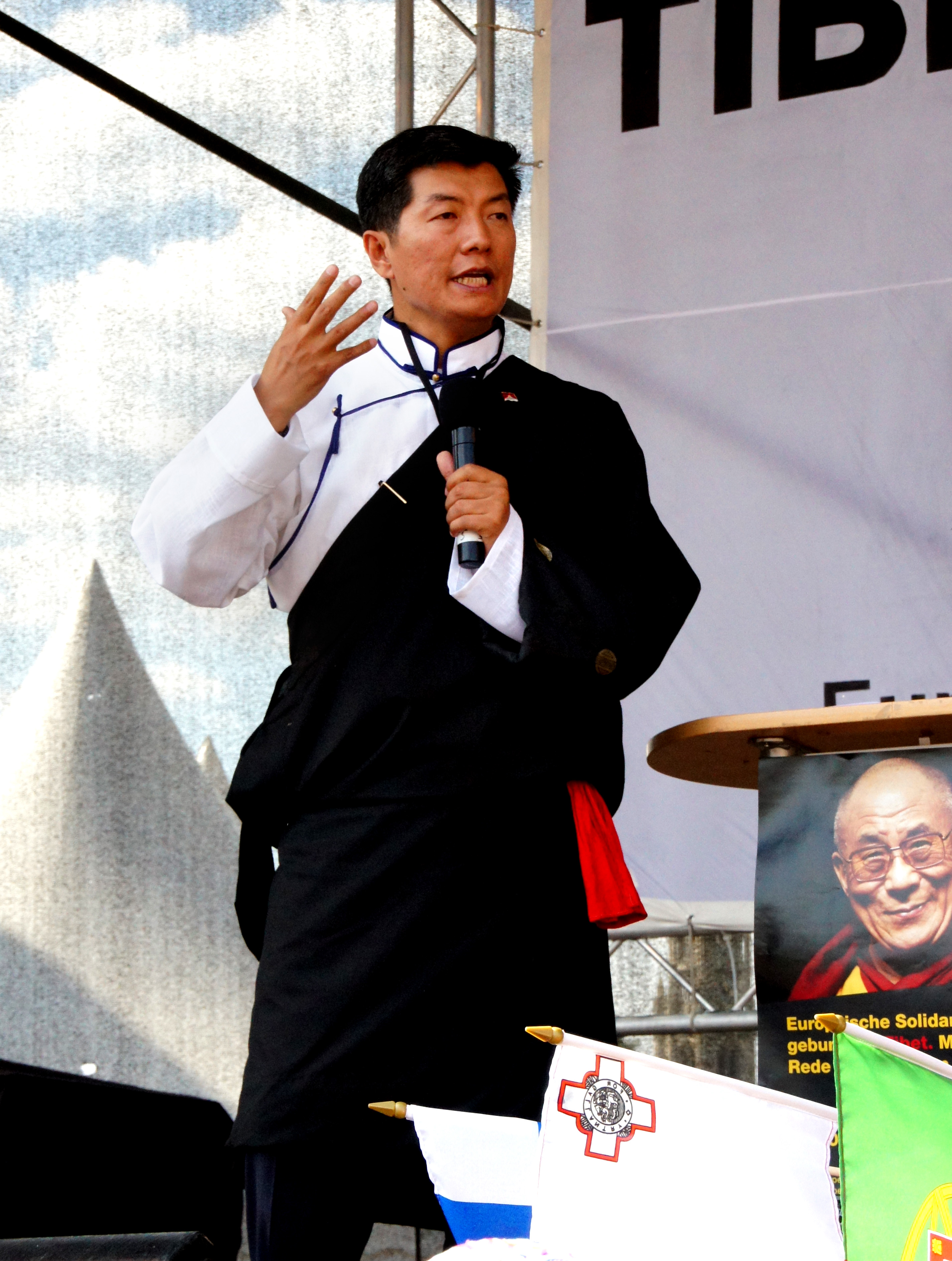
Lobsang Sangay wearing a chuba at a solidarity rally

In the early years of Chinese rule after the annexation of Tibet, traditional clothing was forbidden; items with otter fur were among those confiscated and burned by Chinese authorities, and its usage was banned. In the late 1970s, these restrictions were lifted, and demand for otter pelts grew again; however, the usage of furs sourced from wild animals became a topic of debate in Tibet.

In 2006, the 14th Dalai Lama gave a speech where he said that Tibetans should not wear the furs of endangered species for ethical and environmental reasons. Afterward, people across Tibet publicly burned clothing such as chuba decorated with otter pelts and other types of fur, though the Dalai Lama had not asked people to do so. The demonstrations were motivated by a combination of desire to protect the environment, traditional Buddhist principles of nonviolence to living beings, and wishing to show regard for the exiled Dalai Lama. The wearing of otter furs is now rare in Tibet.

Among the Tibetan diaspora in India, the wearing of chuba is on the decline, with women and older people wearing it more frequently; some only wear it on special occasions. However, chuba has been used as one aspect of nonviolent resistance by the Lhakar movement both within Tibet and in the Tibetan diaspora. For example, many Tibetan schools in India have mandated the wearing of chuba on Wednesdays, and chuba are worn to cultural gatherings.

== See also ==
- Tibetan culture
- Sikkim costumes and traditional dress
- Kira (Bhutan)
