= Wonju (Bhutan) =

Long-sleeved blouse worn by women in Bhutan

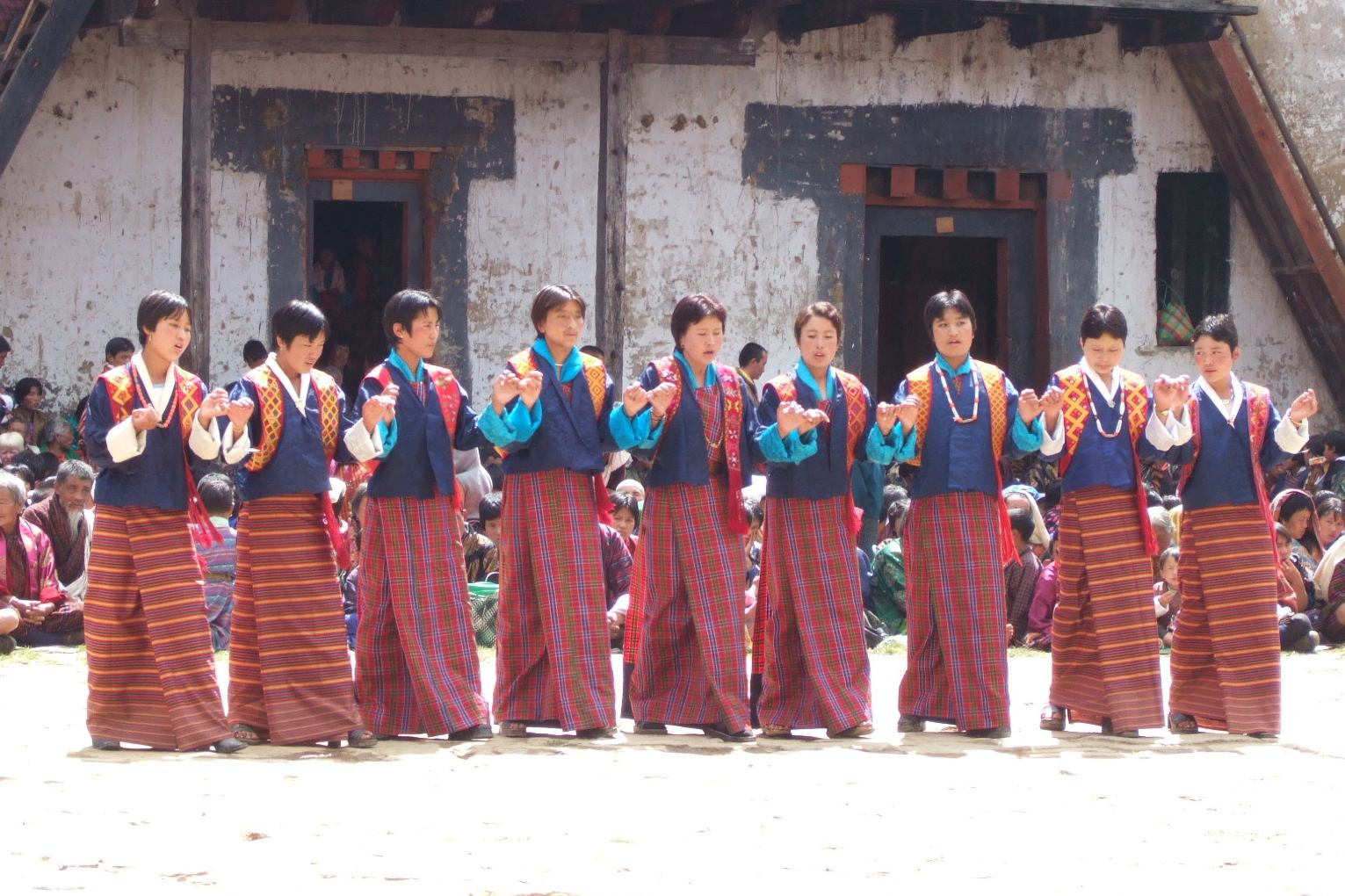
Bhutanese girls wearing kira with wonju visible

A wonju (Dzongkha: འོན་འཇུ་; Wylie: 'on-'ju) is a long-sleeved blouse worn by women in Bhutan. Made of silk, polyester, or lightweight cotton, it is worn underneath the Kira, part of the national costume under the driglam namzha.

== See also ==
- Kira
- Toego
- Driglam namzha
