= Hajong people =

Ethnic group in northeast India

Hajong
হাজং
- A Hajong woman engaged in traditional yarn preparation.

Total population
- 79,800 (2011)

Regions with significant populations
- India: 71,800
- Meghalaya: 41,414
- Assam: 27,521
- Bangladesh: 7,996

Languages
- Hajong

Religion
- Hinduism

Related ethnic groups
- Bodo Kachari groups, other Tibeto-Burman peoples

The Hajong people are an ethnic group of Northeast India and northern parts of Bangladesh. The majority of the Hajongs are settled in India and are predominantly rice-farmers. They are said to have brought wet-field cultivation to the Garo Hills, where the Garo people used slash and burn method of agriculture. Hajong have the status of a Scheduled Tribe in India and they are the fourth largest tribal ethnicity in the Indian state of Meghalaya.

== Origin ==
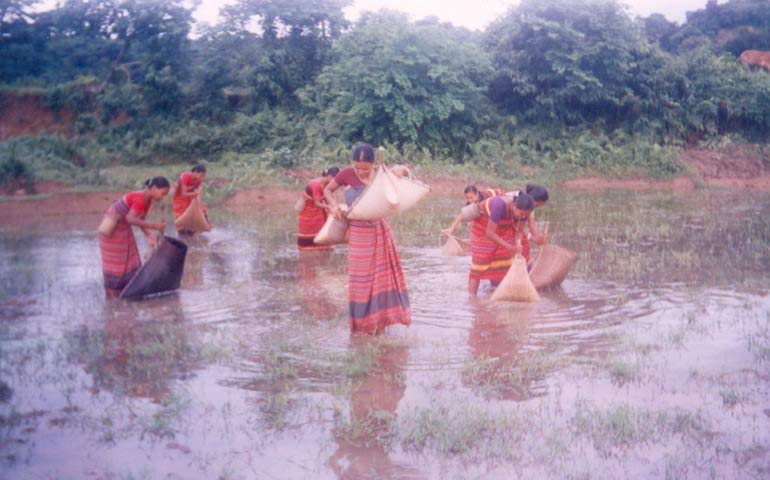
Hajong women fishing with 'Jakha', a traditional fishing implement.

The Hajongs belong to the Bodo-Kachari group of tribes, whose ancestors migrated from Tibet to the Brahmaputra Valley in the ancient past, from where they spread in multiple directions. The Hajongs have no recorded history and whatever historical references available are in the form of legends, folktales, and traditional beliefs. The Hajongs believe that their ancestral land was in Hajo area of present-day Kamrup District of Assam. The meaning of 'Hajong' can thus be comprehended as 'descendants of Hajo'. It is believed that twelve thousand Hajongs fled Hajo and settled in the northern foothills of Garo Hills; from there, they gradually extended their settlement in the southeastern direction, along the foothills of Garo Hills and Khasi-Jaintia Hills. This traditional belief about their migration is corroborated in many of the folktales of the Hajongs. According to a legend prevalent among the Hajongs, they are Suryawanshi (Hajong: Surjobungsi) or the descendants of Surjodyao or Bila (the Sun god) and are Kshatriyas. It is reported that, in 1939, the Hajongs organised a Kshatriya Sanmelan for the welfare of the community and to enforce the observation of their traditions.

== Geographical distribution ==
It is believed that the original heartland of the Hajongs in Garo Hills was in the area lying mostly along the Northeast and Southwest foothills of Garo Hills and part of the southern foothills of Khasi and Jaintia Hills. This wide and plain switch of land in the foothills, half encircling these two hills falls partly in the present-day Goalpara district of Assam, partly in the Garo Hills district of Meghalaya, and partly in the Mymensingh and Sylhet districts of Bangladesh.

According to folklore, the Hajong habitation was said to have started from a small Hajong village called Hwârkuna Situated in the northeastern corner of the foothills of Garo Hills, and ended at another small Hajong village called Jumakuna situated in the southeastern corner of the foothills of Jaintia Hills. The Hajong habitation was said to have extended only this far and no further beyond these two villages in either direction. Today, the Hajongs are spread out across northeast India and Bangladesh with the majority of the population on the India side of the border.

In India, Hajongs are found in both the Garo and Khasi Hills of Meghalaya, largely along the South-West Garo Hills District of Meghalaya and Bangladesh border. They also live in the Dhubri and Goalpara districts of lower Assam, Dhemaji, and other districts of upper Assam into Arunachal Pradesh. In Bangladesh, Hajongs are found in the northern Dhaka division, although there are unconfirmed reports of some Hajong living in Chittagong Division. The narrow strip of borderland that stretches from Sherpur district in the west as far Sunamganj district in the east can be considered the southern outpost of the greater Hajong community.

== Language ==
Hajong is classified as an Indo-Aryan language. It has some degree of similarity with Assamese and Bengali, the two IA languages spoken in the region. At the same time, certain grammatical similarities such as case marking can be found between Hajong and some Tibeto-Burman languages spoken in the same geographic location. The Hajong language was originally a Tibeto-Burman language, but is now considered an Indo-Aryan language with Tibeto-Burman roots. It is spoken by more than 175,000 ethnic Hajongs. It is written in the Eastern Nagari script. It has a lot of Sanskrit loanwords. Hajong phonology has an extra vowel /ɯ/ which is not present in other Indo-Aryan languages, but is typical for the Tibeto-Burman family. The phonology of Hajong has 23 consonant phonemes, 8 vowel phonemes, and 2 approximants that have some characteristics of consonants namely /w/ and /j/ which act as diphthongs, it includes vowel harmony and the devoicing of final consonants. According to one of the several hypotheses, the Hajong language has Sino-Tibetan origins that were relexified by Old Bengali; and some hints of its origin may be shown through the case markers in Hajong. (Note: A third hypothesis is related to the theory that the Hajong language has Sino-Tibetan origins. If it was originally a TibetoBurman language that was relexified by Old Bengali, some hints of its origin may show through. Several TB languages have a genitive [lə] or [la] morpheme such as Gamale Kham13 (Watters 2003: 689), Manange 14 (Hildebrandt 2004), and Tamang 15 (Mazaudon 2003). Interestingly, Gamale Kham also has a [ni] ablative (cf. the Hajong locative ni). Kurtöp16 (Hyslop in prep.) and Lepcha17 (Plaisier 2007) also have [n] based ablatives [ning] ~ [ni] and [nun] ~ [nu], respectively. These languages are spoken in the hills to the north of the Hajong population. Various authors, such as Biren Hajong, have hypothesized that the Hajong people originally migrated down from Tibet.)

== Clothing ==
Hajongs are known for their woven dresses. Hajongs are known for their weaving and handicrafts; their skilled activities are still preserved and passed on through the ages from generation to generation, though there might be minuscule changes in lifestyle with the influence of western way of life. Weaving constitutes an important integral household work for the women and most of the time one can see hajong women weaving and wearing their traditional attire. This is one of the important features observed within this ethnic group and it reveals their affection for their traditional values. Hajong women feel prideful that they can weave their own clothes and also that of her children and members of the family. For maidens, the knowledge of weaving is considered a prime requisite prior to marriage, but because to Western influences this tradition is not strictly adhered to by unmarried women. Every household has a traditional loom called bana; there are two kinds of traditional looms, salbana and sipnibana. The sipnibana is operated solely with hands and does not require the use of feet.

Women of this tribe chiefly wear pathin, a wrap-around skirt that covered the upper and lower part of the body from the bust till the calf of the leg. Women in the upper class wore a long pathin which fell down to the floor while women in the lower class wore a shorter pathin which length reaches to the ankle. The pathin is a horizontally striped, colourful, rectangular piece of cloth with alternate layers of different colours between red stripes and thick horizontal borders. The pathin, also called pate or pâthni, consists of two main sets of stripes: the kan and the gao. If the pathin is observed with the stripes parallel to the horizon, the kan appears to be on the top and bottom ends of the pathin, while the gao is the larger central portion of the pathin. Red is the main colour used in the rangapathin, which is worn by young women; while middle-aged women tend to wear pathins with lesser stripes in shades of green. Women, while working on the fields use the kompes as a banong or belt. The compes is a brocaded scarf mostly used by men, but often women use it to tie their waists. Menfolk wear a woven piece of cloth called ningti or bhijâ kapur, it is worn in the fashion of a dhoti. During winters, both men and women cover their bodies with a traditional brocaded shawl called Argon and men keep their necks warm with a kompes. Other kind of clothes used by the Hajongs are gamsa similar to the Assamese gamosa and pasra, an embroidered light shawl. Buksuli is the traditional shirt used by men.

=== Traditional ornaments ===
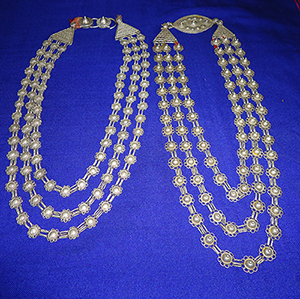
Puspohar or Chondrohar

Hajong women, both young and old, prefer to adorn themselves with traditional ornaments. The majority of the Hajong ornaments are made of silver; while the use of gold, ivory, coral, and conch shells have been observed too. Traditionally, all of the extravagant ornaments belonged to the women of this tribe; men were to only wear their wedding rings called manik angthi and a gold chain. Although men can be seen wearing a red thread on their waist called bâstâ or bâitâ, lugun on their left shoulder, and rosaries made of sandalwood, golden apple and the holy basil. Married women wear conch shell bangles called haka and the wedding ring, manik angthi. Some of the ornaments used by women are listed below

- Galahicha : A Torc.
- Mugâ mala : A gold necklace with alternate red and black beads.
- Gujurâti or Harsura : A chain with floral motifs, made of either gold or silver.
- Chondrohar or Sunchisura : This traditional necklace is made of silver, weighing 35 to 50 grams, and has three to five rows of chains with floral motifs.
- Sikâ mala : A necklace made of coins.
- Katbaju : A pair of armlets made of silver, weighing around 15 to 25 grams.
- Nol Kharu : A pair of thick bangles, both gold and silver is used in the preparation of this category of bangles, weighing around 25 to 35 grams.
- Buila : A pair of silver bangles
- Bak kharu : Pair of open rings worn on the ankles made of silver, weighing around 35 to 50 grams.
- Bak Gunjuri : This is another pair of rings worn on the anklets made of heavy silver bars with small bells along the length, curved into a ring. It is popular for the tinkling sound the bells make.
- Bonko : A pair of silver anklets with a zigzag pattern.
- Koromphul : Pair of earrings worn at the earlobes, with conical protrusions on both sides.
- Kankurya : A pair of curved earrings.
- Kanpasa : A pair of flat earrings with a hook.
- Not : A nose ring made of gold, worn on the left side by married women.
- Nolok : Nose rings worn on the septum, this category includes titlipata, kumrâbisi, jibâli, etc.

== Social divisions ==
=== Obsolete clans ===
Originally the Hajongs were divided into six clans. The present generation is hardly aware that this clan system had ever existed in the past. (Note: 'With the passage of time, the population increased with the rapid expansion of new settlements the outlook of the society changed, and the Hajongs had started gradually to discourage this division system. By the time they had stepped up towards more social upliftment they had long back abolished the system. Today the present generation is hardly aware that such a system as mentioned above (social structure) had ever existed in the past.' — an extract from The Cultural Heritage of Meghalaya, Chapter 9: Socio-Cultural Aspects of the Hajongs of Meghalaya, Social Structure of the Hajongs.) The origin of these clans are traced back to the twelve thousand Hajongs who had crossed the Brahmaputra river and entered Garo Hills from Hajo. The descendants of these twelve thousand people were divided into six groups under the leadership of six heads: Harang, Bhajalu, Manik, Teper, Satodol, and Manji. These six clans were named after these tribal heads.

- Harangpâryâ
- Bhajalupâryâ
- Manikpâryâ
- Teperpâryâ
- Satodolpâryâ
- Manjipâryâ

=== Matrilineal clans: Nikni ===
The Hajong clans were formally organised on the basis of matrilineal exogamy. They were divided into several matrilineal clans called nikni. Although, the hajongs were an endogamous tribe, clan exogamy was practised where one wasn't allowed to be wed to someone belonging to the same nikni. It has been documented that anybody who could not tell his nikni was mocked and was said to have belonged to the Ghughu nikni, the word ghugu in Hajong means a dove, a kind of a wild pigeon. Doves breed only two offspring at a time. These two squabs grow up to mate with each other despite being siblings. Similarly, a Hajong who could not tell his own nikni was assailed wittingly to be a member of the dove clan hinting indirectly that he had married his own sister. The inner intention or significance of this was to direct or make each Hajong to be particularly familiar with his own clan so that he could avoid marrying a girl belonging to his own nikni due to his ignorance. Marriage within one's own nikni was strictly prohibited on the grounds that genealogically a girl from the same nikni was considered his own sister.

The exact number of nikni is not known, some have listed seventeen; while others have said that only thirteen of the niknis could be found.

List 1

- Parachungâ
- Chundi
- Batajurâ
- Balihata
- Kendegao
- Taragao
- Jignigao
- Katligao
- Buligao
- Kamakkha
- Kharugao
- Sunamôi
- Chatigao
- Kumligao
- Ghurabali
- Porosmuni
- Akhigao

List 2

- Puwachungwâ
- Chundi
- Purakati
- Dinjâr
- Balihata
- Kendegao
- Akshigao
- Kasigao
- Toklegao
- Bagigao
- Katagao
- Simulgao
- Diphrâgao

The Puwachungwâ nikni was regarded as the leading clan and members of this clan would enjoy respectable positions in society. It is noted that members of some of these niknis had developed a feeling of collateral relation with the plants, fruits, insects, etc., that their clans had been named after.

=== Patrilineal kinship: Daidi ===
The daidi or daigi system possibly began during the time when they were following the matrilineal system. Daidi actually means kinship or descent through the male or father's line. A person having a distant relation with any member of the kinship of his father's line is called a daidi bhagi or daidi gusti. A daidi bhagi or a daidi gusti was liable to observe a state of pollution called swâ for three days when the news of the death of any of his daidi gusti was heard and he was to be purified by performing certain religious rites. Unlike the nikni system, the daidi system had no division and it did not become a cause for the development of any kind of clan, class or group in the society. It was to see, similar to the nikni system, that there should be no daidi relationship between the proposed bride and the groom. If it was found that both of them or their families were daidi bhagi or daidi gusti to each other, the proposal was to be immediately dropped.

=== Geographical divisions: Jwar ===
The Hajongs are divided into five geographical clans called jwar. Hajongs belonging to each jwar speak a different dialect of Hajong called rao. These clans are named after the archaic names of the areas in the foothills and the plains of Garo Hills. Among these clans, the Barohajari clan is named after the area where the twelve thousand Hajongs from Hajo had first settled in Garo Hills. The five jwars are listed below:

- Doskinâ
- Korebari
- Susung'yâ
- Barohajari
- Mespâryâ

== Religion ==
Hajongs are predominantly Hindu. All Hindu Customs are adhered to right from the time of birth. Hindu beliefs have been interwined with their original culture and it is impossible to separate them. The present religious customs practised by the Hajongs can be considered an amalgation of their folk religion and Hinduism, as it was not seen to conflict with the rites of their traditional animistic religion, giving birth to a new variety of syncretic Hinduism. No information is available as to how the Hajongs came under the influence of Hinduism in the long past as no written records exist to this effect. Only an attempt can be made with reference to their religious traditions, customs, conventions, etc., some of which are still being followed by Hajongs and also in the context of the religious atmosphere found to have prevailed in those days in the place where their forefathers were lioving and from where they are said to have migrated.

=== Religious sects ===
There are two documented sections among the Hajongs, Khatal and Hajong. The main difference between these two sections is that the Khatals prohibits the use and preparation of rice beer. It is observed that among these two sections, the degree of Hinduisation varies. There are differences even among the Khatals themselves. The Khatals are divided into Bastom and Khutri. The hereditary Udhikâri or the priest class, the Hajong equivalent of the Hindu Brahmin, belong to the Bastom section while the Khutri class is the Hajong counterpart of the Kshatriya class. The Hajong section of the society observes both traditional and Hindu customs; this section does not have any special name as they are believed to practice the traditional religion and have not been greatly influenced by mainstream Hinduism. The nikni system is preserved by this section of society, whereas the Khutri section follows the Hindu Gotra system. The social outcasts belong to the Dirkâ class. The Hajongs living in close proximity with larger Hindu populations have absorbed more elements of Hinduism than those who inhabit the interior areas where the influence of the Hindu caste system is less.

== Marriage ==
Hajongs are endogamous people. Marriage with a person outside of their tribe is strictly forbidden, cases of such marriages are rare. Monogamy is the prevalent form of marriage; polygyny is not prohibited, but such marriages are rare. A negotiated alliance is the usual form of marriage. Within Hajong culture, romantic love and widow remarriage is allowed. When intimacy develops between a boy and a girl without the knowledge of their parents, they are married to each other, provided that they do not belong to close maternal and paternal kinship. The exorbitant dowry system is absent in the Hajong society. The Hajongs would give a tolerable bride price called pon or khalti.

== Culture ==
The Hajongs have a very rich culture. Hajong culture has greatly influenced and has had a tremendous impact on the language, clothing, and culture of other tribes like the Koches of Meghalaya, Banais, and Dalus. Hajong women can be easily identified by their brightly striped red dress called Pathin. Traditionally, and in many present-day villages, women are accomplished weavers who weave their own dresses. The Hajongs make it compulsory for every woman to know the art of weaving, which is regarded as a qualification for a woman for marriage. The Hajongs are a group of agrarian people, most of their cultural practices, folklore and traditions are related to their agricultural practices. Hajongs are skilled in woodwork and basketry, they make all of their farming tools and household items themselves. In addition to the implements needed for rice farming, Hajong households have many bamboo fishing implements.

=== House pattern ===
In a Hajong village, except for the house of an Udhikâri, all other houses are almost similar in pattern with different sizes. The scenario of having an earthen plinth and two thatched roofs on both sides is common in every Hajong village. Bamboos and timbers are used occasionally. Floors are earthen and walls are made of split bamboo plastered with cow dung. Mak Mas (January- February) and Phalgun Mas (February- March) are the two most favourable months for constructing a new house. During this period, they are free from agricultural works. Traditional Hajong houses consist of separate buildings centered on a courtyard. The Hajongs customarily construct four or five houses on the four sides protecting the middle portion of the courtyard. The courtyard is used as a space for religious rites. The kitchen is built separately from the main dwelling. There is a common courtyard in every household which is used for threshing grains after harvest. A typical Hajong household consists of the buildings listed below:

- Bhat ghor: also called mâijâ ghor, is the main dwelling, dining hall and also a bedroom
- Akhli ghor: kitchen
- Kasri ghor: dormitory with provision for guests
- Khupra ghor: also called jura ghor, bedroom for a married son or daughter
- Chang ghor: granary
- Dhiki ghor: husking house
- Guli ghor: cattle shed
- Dyao ghor: a shrine for the household deities

=== Food habits ===
The staple food is rice eaten with lentils and vegetables. For special occasions, rice is ground into fine powder and used to make steamed or fried rice cakes called pithâ. Tortoise has traditionally been the favourite meat. Some of the traditional dishes are:

- Dingpura : a type of sweet rice cooked in a special type of Bamboo
- Libahak : dishes made with ground rice
- Bukni Bhat : fermented rice
- Bisi Bhat : a type of steamed sticky and sweet rice
- Bhâtuwahak : dishes with rice flour and fermented fish
- Putâmas : small fishes steamed in banana leaves
- Chunsâhak : a type of cooked vegetable for special guest
- Tupla Bhat : rice cooked in banana leaves
- Kharpani : vegetable boiled with dried fish and soda
- Chungâhak : dishes cooked in bamboo

=== Art ===
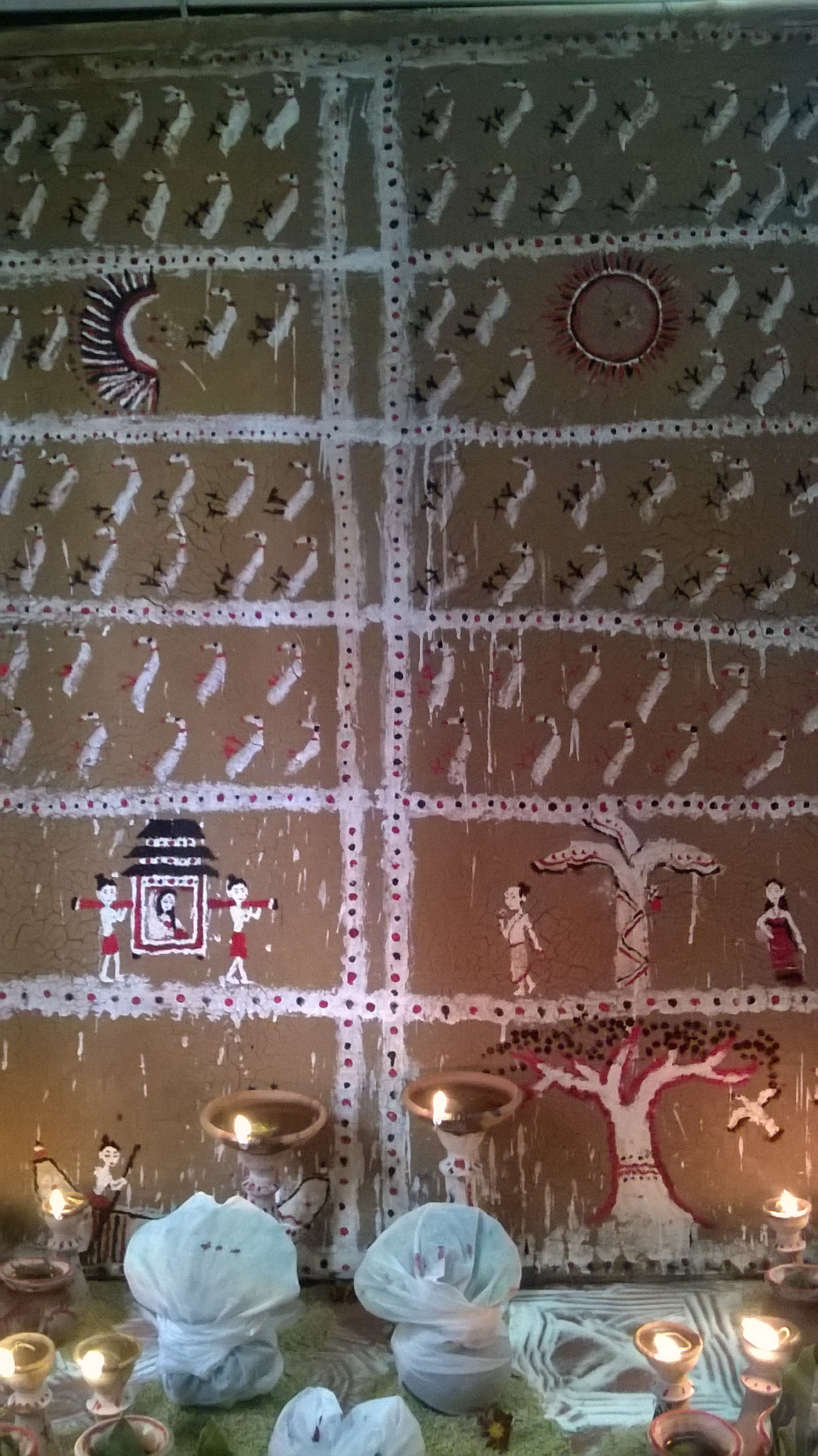
Birapat-Chhitâ

Hajong Art includes Birapat-chitâ which are painted on a wall of the Airo Ghor by airos on the during wedding ceremonies. In Birapat-chita also called Chan Bila Akawa the Sun, Moon, Stars, birds, boats and palanquins are painted with powdered rice (pithli), vermilion and kohl. Other works of art is done in the preparation of Merr for Maroi Pujâ. In Merr various Gods and Goddesses and other auspicious objects are painted, intended for the worship of the serpent goddess Kani Diyao. Another popular folk art among the hajongs is paper cutting. Paper cuttings with elaborate designs are hung on the doors during weddings and other festive occasions. Ceremonial banana trees are often decorated with intricate paper cuttings.

=== Music ===
Traditional music includes gitâlu gahen, gupni gahen and several songs related to agriculture and religious rites. Some of the traditional instruments are listed below:

- Dhuluk : a broad drum with membranes at each end played from two ends.
- Basi : a flute.
- Khul : a pair of small cymbals made of brass.
- Dutra : a stringed instrument.
- Dhapa kurtal : a pair of large cymbals.
- Hurindo : a fiddle.
- Hamuktal : an instrument made with apple snail shells.
- Gugna : a lamellophone instrument, consisting of a flexible bamboo tongue attached to a frame.

=== Festivals ===
Pusnâ is one of the most important festivals celebrated by the Hajongs marking the end of winter and the month of Pus; It is the celebration of Makar Sankranti, with feasts lasting for a week. Hajong people celebrate Hindu festivals like Durga Puja and Kamakhya Puja. They also celebrate a few traditional festivals. Traditional rituals are performed by a Dyushi or a Nungtang, a Hajong shaman. Bastu pujâ, being one of the traditional festivals, does not involve idol worship and is celebrated in an area outside the village premises, called Bastu hali or Bastu than. In Bastu pujâ tortoises and pigeons are sacrificed for Bastu dyao. Another festival is called chormaga in Mymensingh and chorkhila in India. Chorkhila is celebrated during the month of October in South-West Garo Hills Districts of Meghalaya. During this festival, group of young people go around each house in the village, or from village to village, playing music and singing folsongs, sometimes stories from the Ramayana. The parties receive some rice or money in return for their performance. Since every person, both young and old, comes out to watch the play, this is considered a chance to check out prospective brides and grooms. The Hajongs also celebrate their pre-monsoon harvest festival known as 'Biswâ'. Kani pujâ, Kâtkâ pujâ, are also performed on the last day of the month of Srabon and Kati. The day of Sharad Purnima is known as Kujâi Ghor among the Hajongs.

== Bibliography ==
- Nath, D. (1989), History of the Koch Kingdom, C. 1515-1615, Mittal Publications, pp. 4–9, ISBN 8170991099
- Endle, Sidney (1911). The Kacharis. Macmillan and Co.
- Hajong, B. 2002, The Hajongs and their Struggle
