= Kira (Bhutan) =

National dress for women in Bhutan

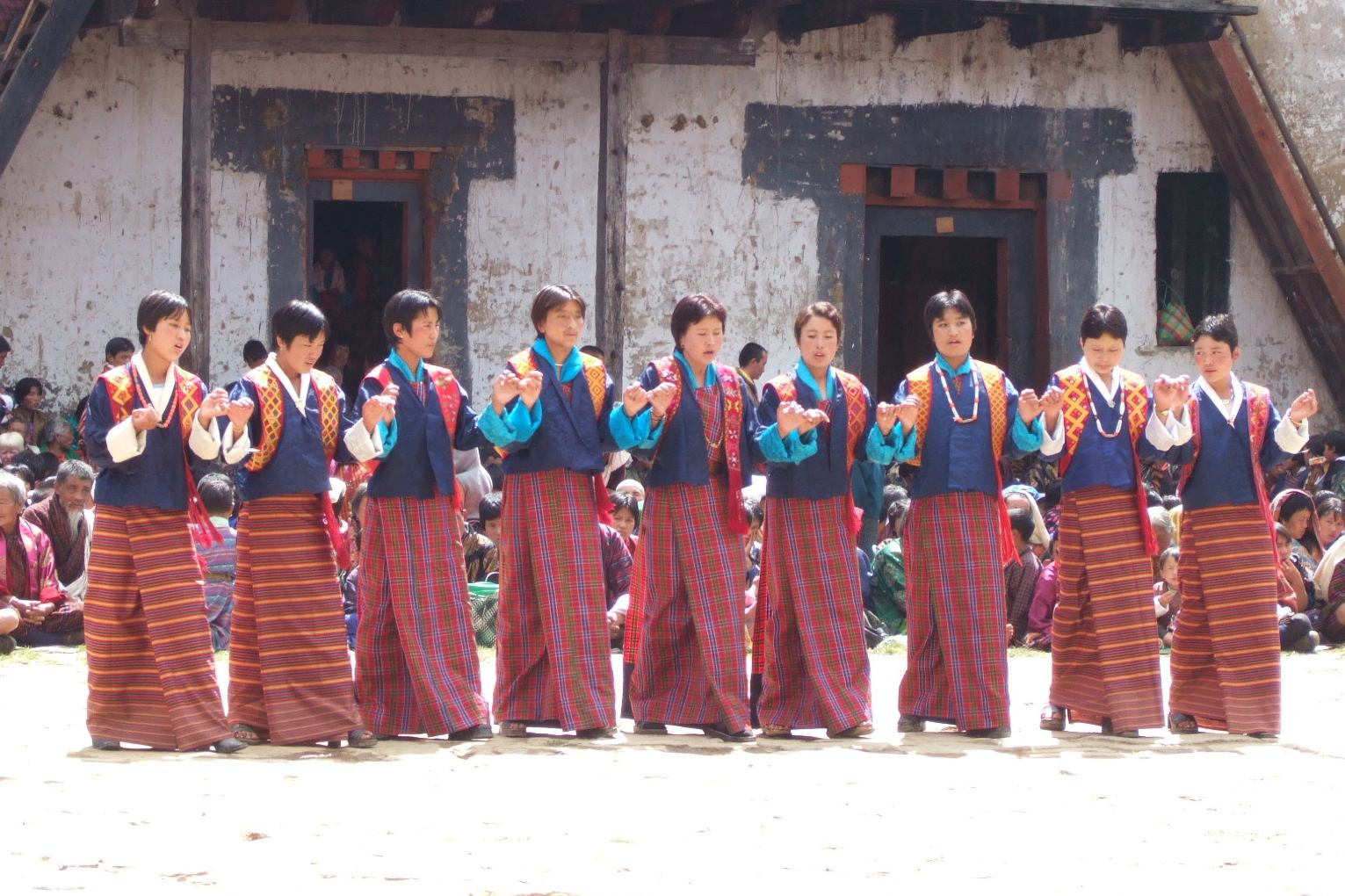
Bhutanese girls wearing kira and toego

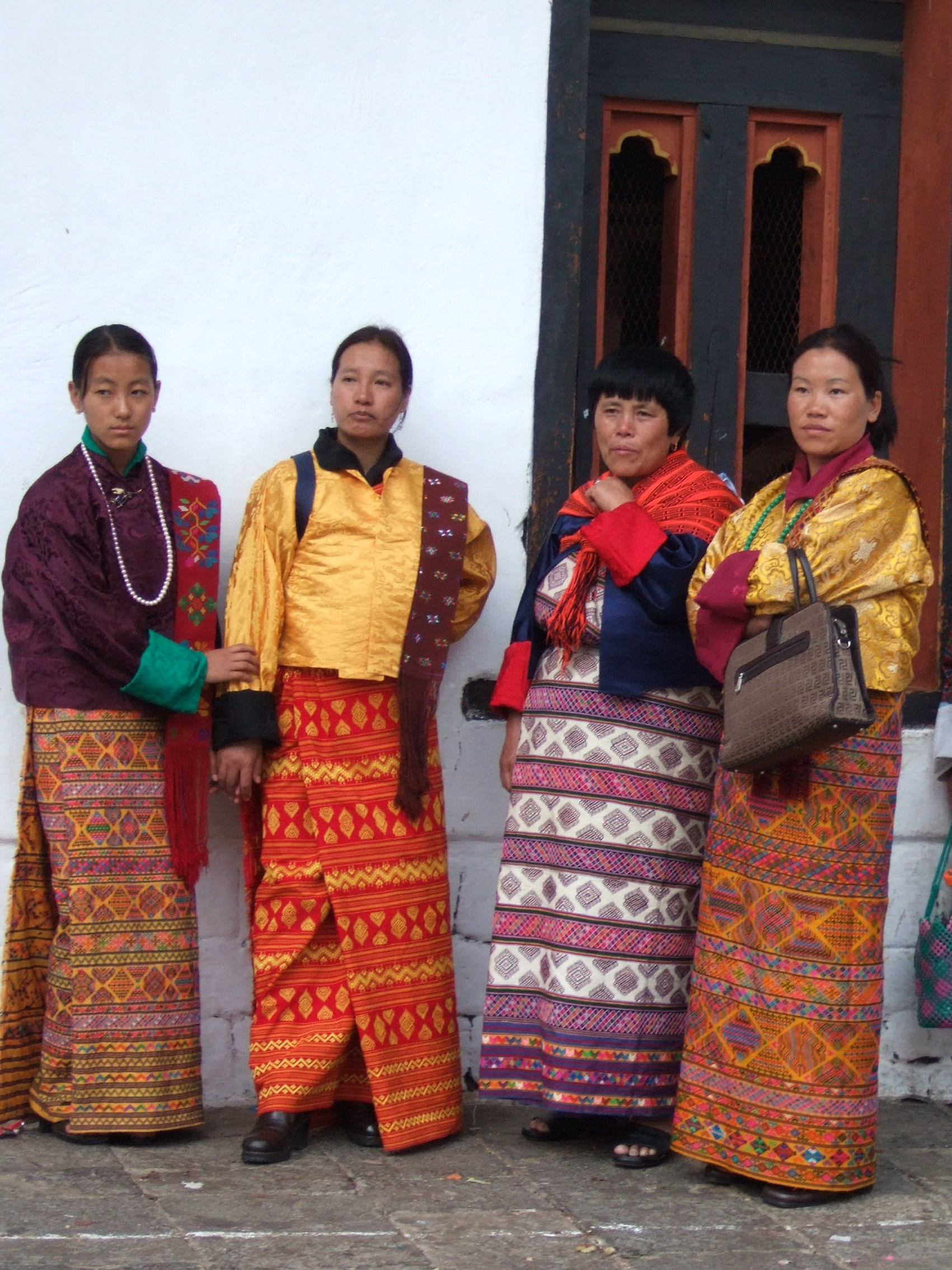
Bhutanese women wearing kiras

The kira (Dzongkha: དཀྱི་ར་, དཀྱིས་རས་, romanized: dkyi-ra, dkyis-ras) is the national dress for women in Bhutan. It is an ankle-length dress consisting of a rectangular piece of woven fabric. It is wrapped and folded around the body and is pinned at both shoulders, usually with silver brooches (named koma), and bound at the waist with a long belt. The kira is usually worn with a wonju (long-sleeved blouse) inside and a short jacket or toego (Dzongkha: སྟོད་གོ་, romanized: stod-go) outside.

A rachu (narrow embroidered cloth draped over the left shoulder) is worn over the traditional dress kira.

== See also ==
- Kho
- Chuba
- Toego
- Wonju
- Pathin
- Phasinh
- Rigwnai
- Gho
- Longyi
