= Cinema of Bhutan =

The cinema of Bhutan is a small but emerging industry, having started in the mid-1990s. It has since been supported by government officials and different businesses.

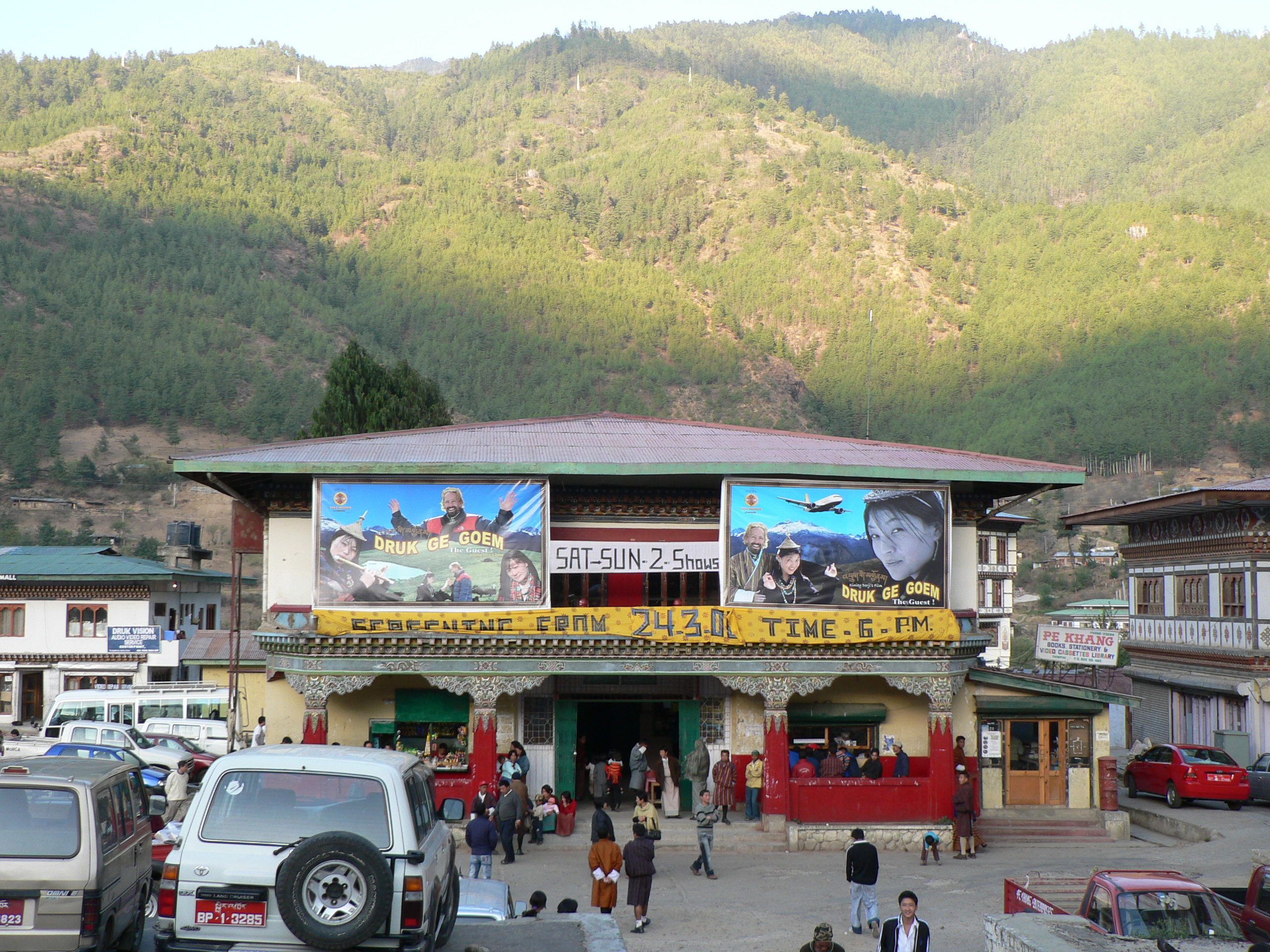
A cinema hall in Thimphu

Bhutan's film industry is highly influenced by neighboring Indian film industry, with most Bhutanese films being adaptations of Indian ones or based on the Indian film format. In the 21st century there have been calls by local filmmakers for a tilt towards originality in Bhutanese cinema. Many films have started to blend Indian cinema with local Buddhist teachings and traditions, and Bollywood films are now rarely seen in Bhutanese cinema halls after more than a decade of domination. Storytelling based on Buddhist oral history and supernatural beliefs are increasingly influencing Bhutanese cinematic structure.

As of 2011, Bhutan's film industry produced an average of thirty films a year. By 2012, Thimphu had six cinema halls. Bhutanese films frequently draw on Buddhist themes but increasingly feature ordinary subject matter as well.

== History ==
In 1989, Ugyen India directed Gasa Lamai Singye, the first Bhutanese feature film. Gasa Lamai Singye, a tragic love story reminiscent of Romeo and Juliet, had a remake in 2016, directed by Sonam Lhendup Tshering. Wangdi went on to direct several documentary films His Yonten Gi Kawa (Price of Knowledge, 1998) was the first documentary made in Bhutan, and followed the daily life of a 11-year-old boy at home and school. It was followed by Yi Khel Gi Kawa (Price of A Letter, 2004), where Wangdi tells the story of a postal runner who worked throughout Bhutan for 26 years.

In 1999, Tshering Wangyel released the first commercially successful movie in Dzongkha language, Rewaa (Hope), a love story where two college boys fall for the same girl. As one critic put it, "the commercial Bhutanese film industry was born." Wangyel went on to produce some 50 movies and died of pneumonia while making his last film. In 2007, he had produced Bakchha, the first Bhutanese horror movie.

Buddhist lama Khyentse Norbu wrote and directed four award-winning films, The Cup (1999), Travellers & Magicians (2003), Vara: A Blessing (2013), and Hema Hema: Sing Me A Song While I Wait (2016). Travellers & Magicians was the first feature film to be entirely shot within Bhutan. Hema Hema, which tells its story by following a mysterious ritual in the forest where all participants are masked, was praised by critics for "its portrayal of complex Buddhist themes like transgression, by juxtaposing them on to modern topics like anonymity on the Internet." Another Buddhist lama, Neten Chokling, appeared in Travellers & Magicians, and in 2006 directed his own feature film, Milarepa.

The Holder, a short film, coordinated by Jamyang Dorji, debuted at the 2011 Cannes Film Festival and was screened in Brussels together with Original Photocopy of Happiness by Dechen Roder, a young director from Bumthang who went on to direct in 2016 the mystery film Honeygiver Among the Dogs. The movie was described as "a genre-bending work, blending elements of neo-noir with Bhutanese mysticism."

in 2014, Karma Dhendup directed Ap Bokto, a 3-D computer-animated fim based on a Bhutanese folk tale. In 2016, Drukten: The Dragon's Treasure was the first Bhutanese 2-D animated movie.

In 2017, R.C. Chand's film Thimphu was hailed as "doing away with the notion that all independent Bhutanese movies draw upon the country's Buddhist mysticism." It presents the life of Bhutan's capital through different characters, including an alcoholic family, a transgender woman, and a young singer with problems of career and love.

Female directors are rare in Bhutan. One is Kesang Chuki, who produced ten documentaries, docudramas, and short movies, including Nangi Aums to Go-thrips (Housewives to Leaders, 2011), about the problems of Bhutanese women who assume public roles, and A Young Democracy (2008), where Chuki accompanies two candidates in their campaigns for the first ever democratic election in Bhutan.

The Next Guardian was the first feature-length documentary film by Bhutanese director Arun Bhattarai and Hungarian director Dorrotya Zurbo. It premiered at IDFA, 2017 and was featured in MoMA among several other film festivals.

The Bhutan Beskop film celebration (2010, 2011) was a significant event for the local film industry. Financial specialists and sometimes banks fund new productions that are screened in one of Bhutan's several cinemas, of which the Lugar Lobby in Thimphu with 880 seats is the biggest.

In 2019, the film Lunana: A Yak in the Classroom, directed by Pawo Choyning Dorji, received international acclaim and was nominated for Best International Feature Film at the 94th Academy Awards.

== Main issues ==
=== Market ===
The Bhutanese market is small. Though the major cities have movie theaters, the country's largely rural structure makes distribution a challenge. In an interview in 2015 with the Hindustan Times, director Tshering Wangyel stated that it is still necessary to "lug a makeshift cinema from village to village to reach Bhutan's movie-loving population," renting school auditoriums or setting up a tent in each venue, and it can take a year for a movie to screen across the entire country. Much has improved in the 21st century but, according to Wangyel, "distribution continues to be a slog, handicapping the industry's growth." Despite these problems, Wangyel said, "the industry is thriving, with audiences in one of the most remote countries on earth flocking to homegrown movies."

=== Production ===
Bhutan's film industry has a limited number of studios, with incomplete equipment. Most directors contribute money to their own productions, although in the 21st century international funding has been occasionally available.

=== Quality ===
A few Bhutanese movies have won international acclaim. Others are seen as repetitious, returning time and again on Buddhist legends and the "clash between tradition and modernity, with conservatism getting the last word as characters hold forth on the importance of prayer and background chants urge viewers to be good Buddhists."

=== Piracy ===
Piracy has been a worldwide issue and influences the Bhutan film industry. DVDs are effortlessly duplicated in Nepal/India and retailed through shops in the urban areas. Anti-theft measures are regarded as largely insufficient. "The long wait for screenings" has been blamed for the flourishing of a piracy industry servicing "impatient audiences eager to watch illegal copies of Dzongkha-language films."

== Future ==
The government of Bhutan regards cinema as important, and has committed itself to promote the local production with adequate studios and support, and more effective policies against copyright infringement.

Critical voices like director Tashy Gyeltshen are afraid that "the relentless push to promote tradition while imitating Bollywood formula risk creating a 'cultural desert' for future generations," with the most acclaimed directors just "wallowing in past glory." There are also, however, more optimistic voices, persuaded that change is coming with a new generation of Bhutanese directors who "shun the influence of Bollywood and look inward,".

== See also ==
- List of Bhutanese films
