= List of Bhutanese films =

This is a list of films produced in the country of Bhutan. The films are all produced in Dzongkha language, the national language of Bhutan. Bhutanese films have gained a vast popularity amongst its citizens in the recent times due to various available multi media. Dzongkha movies contain many songs for audience attentions.

Bhutanese movies are now shot in countries as far away as America and Australia.

In 2010, for the first time more than 3 films (6) were released in the country.

== 1980s ==
- Gasa Lamai Singye (1989)

== 1990s ==
- The Cup (1999)

== 2000s ==
- Price of Knowledge (2000)
- Chepai Bhu (2001) by Bhutan's first trained director, Karma Tshering
- When We Chat (2001)
- Tshangpa (2002)
- Nyen Dang Dra (2003)
- Travellers and Magicians (2003)
- Tshering Meto (2004)
- Lengo (2005)
- Muti Thrishing: The Perfect Girl (2005)
- 49th Day (2006)
- Golden Cup: The Legacy (2006)
- Milarepa (2006)
- Bakchha (2007)
- Fate Cheats (2007)
- Zhizang (2007)
- Ata Yongba (2008)
- Arunachal Pradesh to Thimphu (2008)
- My Yangsel (2008)
- Chorten Kora II (2009)

== 2010s ==
- Bardo: The Karma Laden's State (2010)
- Lengom (2010)
- The Destiny (2010)
- Nowi Hingkhar (2010)
- Sacho Gamiga (2010)
- Sha Dha Simo (2010)
- The Container (2011)
- Original Photocopy of Happiness (2011)
- Sharchokpa Zamin (2011)
- Singlem (2011)
- Gawa - The Other Side of the Moon (2012)
- Penlop AGAY Haap (2012)
- Ap Bokto (2014)
- Hema Hema (2016)
- Honeygiver Among the Dogs (2016)
- Thimphu (2017)
- Sertsho [Dir: Kezang Dorji Wang] (2017)
- The Red Phallus (2018)
- Lunana: A Yak in the Classroom (2019)
- Nge Agay ("My Grandfather") [Dir: Kezang Dorji Wang] (2019)

== 2020s ==
- The Monk and the Gun (2023)
- I, the Song (2024)

== Unknown ==
- GoodBye Galem
- Yeethro Lhamo
- Zhetha Gyab
