= DEM (disambiguation) =

DEM was the ISO 4217 currency code for the Deutsche Mark, former currency of Germany.

DEM or Dem may also refer to:

== Computing ==
- Digital elevation model, a digital representation of ground-surface topography or terrain
  - .dem, a common extension for USGS DEM files
- Discrete element method or discrete element modeling, a family of numerical methods for computing the motion of a large number of small particles (like molecules or grains of sand)
- Diffuse element method, a numerical simulation method used (for example) to solve partial differential equations
- Display Encode Mode, a feature of the AMD's Video Codec Engine
- Distance Estimation Method, for drawing Julia sets or Mandelbrot sets

== Organisations ==
- Department of Environmental Management, a name of various government entities
- Democratic Party, short form of the name of the political parties in the world
- Democratic Party (United States)
- Democrats (Brazil)
- Dravske elektrarne Maribor d.o.o., an electric power company in Slovenia
- Day Eight Music, a record label founded by Jonas Hellborg
- Halkların Eşitlik ve Demokrasi Partisi, abbreviated as DEM Parti.

== People ==
- Dem I. Dobrescu, Romanian mayor
- Dem Rădulescu (1931–2000), Romanian actor, director, and politician
- Dem. Theodorescu (1888–1946), Romanian journalist
- Gheorghe Dem Teodorescu (1849–1900), Romanian writer
- Damchae Dem, Bhutanese entrepreneur
- Dawa Dem (1944–2018), Bhutanese civil servant
- Henry Patrick Mboma Dem (born 1970), Cameroonian football striker
- Jamil Dem (born 1993), German football defender
- Yeshey Dem (fl. 2018–present), Bhutanese politician

== Other uses ==
- Dem language
- Demonstrative linguistic categories (abbreviated dem)
- Deus ex machina (Latin; literally "a god from a machine"), a resolution to a story that does not pay due regard to the story's internal logic and that is so unlikely that it challenges suspension of disbelief, and presumably allows the author, director, or developer to end the story in the way that he or she desired
- Diethyl malonate, the diethyl ester of malonic acid
- Dynamic element matching, a technique used in integrated circuits design to compensate for components mismatch
- Dem3000, an online handle of YouTuber Jakub Dębski
- Lake Dem, lake in Burkina Faso
