= List of Bhutanese submissions for the Academy Award for Best International Feature Film =

Best International Feature Film submissions from Bhutan

Highlights
- Debut: 1999
- Submissions: 4
- Nominations: 1
- Oscar winners: none

Bhutan is among the one hundred countries that have submitted films for consideration for the Academy Award for Best International Feature Film, (Note: The category was previously named the Academy Award for Best Foreign Language Film, but this was changed to the Academy Award for Best International Feature Film in April 2019, after the Academy deemed the word "Foreign" to be outdated.) making their first submission in 1999. The Foreign Language Film award is handed out annually by the United States Academy of Motion Picture Arts and Sciences to a feature-length motion picture produced outside the United States that contains primarily non-English dialogue.

As of 2025, Bhutan has been nominated once for Lunana: A Yak in the Classroom (2021).

== Submissions ==
The Academy of Motion Picture Arts and Sciences has invited the film industries of various countries to submit their best film for the Academy Award for Best International Feature Film since 1956. The International Feature Film Committee oversees the process and reviews all the submitted films. Following this, they vote via secret ballot to determine the five nominees for the award.

The country's first submission The Cup (1999) was directed by Khyentse Norbu, and followed the novice monks who desperately try to obtain a television for their remote Himalayan monastery to watch the 1998 FIFA World Cup final.

Lunana: A Yak in the Classroom (2019), directed by Pawo Choyning Dorji, was initially submitted for the 93rd Academy Awards but was disqualified. It was resubmitted for the 94th Academy Awards, and was nominated, marking the country first nomination.

Dorji's The Monk and the Gun (2023) advanced to the December shortlists, but was not nominated.

Below is a list of the films that Bhutan has submitted for review by the Academy for the award by year and the respective Academy Awards ceremony.

| Year (Ceremony) | Film title used in nomination | Original title | Language(s) | Director | Result |
|---|---|---|---|---|---|
| 1999 (72nd) | The Cup | ཕོར་པ། | Dolpali, Hindi, Tibetan | Khyentse Norbu | Not nominated |
| 2020 (93rd) | Lunana: A Yak in the Classroom | ལུང་ནག་ན | Dzongkha, English | Pawo Choyning Dorji | Disqualified |
| 2021 (94th) | Lunana: A Yak in the Classroom | ལུང་ནག་ན | Dzongkha, English | Pawo Choyning Dorji | Nominated |
| 2023 (96th) | The Monk and the Gun | | Dzongkha, English | Pawo Choyning Dorji | Made shortlist |
| 2025 (98th) | I, the Song | མོ་གི་གསང་བའི་ཞབས་ཁྲ | Dzongkha | Dechen Roder | Not nominated |

== See also ==
- List of Academy Award winners and nominees for Best International Feature Film
- List of Academy Award-winning foreign language films
