= List of lakes of Burkina Faso =

This is a list of lakes of Burkina Faso.

== B ==
- Lake Bam
- Lake Boukou

== D ==
- Lake Dem

== H ==
- Lake Higa

== K ==
- Lake Kompienga

== M ==
- Mare aux Hippopotames
- Mare d'Oursi

== T ==
- Lake Tengrela
