= Dems =

Dems or DEMS may refer to:

- Democratic Party (United States)
- Drone-Enhanced Emergency Medical Services
- Deepika English Medium School
- Defensively equipped merchant ship
- Digital Evidence Management System

== See also ==
- DEM (disambiguation)
