= 18th Rome Film Festival =

18th edition of Rome Film Festival

Festa del Cinema di Roma
- Official poster
- Opening film: There's Still Tomorrow by Paola Cortellesi
- Location: Auditorium Parco della Musica, Rome
- Founded: 2006
- Directors: Francesca Via
- Hosted by: Cinema Per Roma Foundation; Rome City of Film
- Artistic director: Paola Malanga
- Festival date: Opening: October 18, 2023; Closing: October 29, 2023
- Language: International
- Website: www.romacinemafest.it

Rome Film Festival
- 19th 17th

The 18th Rome Film Festival took place from 18 to 29 October 2023 in the Auditorium Parco della Musica, Rome. The festival programme was unveiled by Gian Luca Farinelli, the chair of the Rome Cinema Foundation on 22 September 2023. It opened with There's Still Tomorrow the directorial debut film of Italian actress, screenwriter Paola Cortellesi.

The official image of the event was dedicated to Anna Magnani, on the occasion of fiftieth anniversary of her death, which was taken from the press conference for the Oscar for Best Actress in 1956, awarded for her performance in 1955 film The Rose Tattoo. In addition to the main screenings at the Renzo Piano-designed auditorium, screenings were also held in various other venues, including a program of fresh films and talks in local penitentiaries.

The award ceremony took place on 28 October at the Auditorium Parco della Musica. Progressive Cinema Competition Award for Best Film was awarded to Toll, a Brazilian-Portuguese drama film by Carolina Markowicz. Shigeru Umebayashi, a Japanese composer, and Isabella Rossellini, an Italian-American actress and model, were honoured with Lifetime Achievement Award.

== Events ==
- Masterclass: A journey through the careers, lives and works of famous stars of the big screen.
  - Isabella Rossellini, recipient of Lifetime Achievement Award
  - Shigeru Umebayashi, recipient of Lifetime Achievement Award
  - Michel Gondry
- Absolute Beginners: Successful authors recall the story of their debut in cinema.
  - Giuseppe Tornatore
  - Gianfranco Rosi
- Paso Doble: Dialogue and confrontation on stage between two authors.
  - Emma Dante, Elena Stancanelli
  - Lisandro Alonso, Alessio Rigo De Righi

== Jury ==
=== Progressive Cinema Competition Award ===
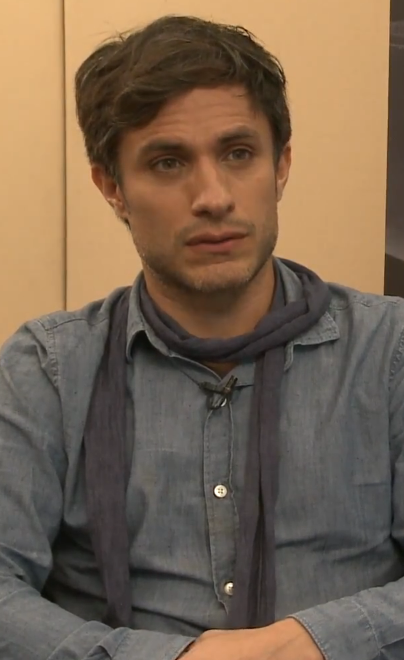
Gael García Bernal, Jury President

- Gael García Bernal, Mexican actor and filmmaker – president
- Sarah Gavron, British film director.
- Mikko Myllylahti, director, Finland
- Melvil Poupaud, French actor, director and screenwriter
- Jasmine Trinca, Italian actress and director

=== Best First Work Award BNL BNP Paribas ===
- Paolo Virzì, director (Italy) – president
- Adeline Fontan Tessaur, producer (France)
- Abi Morgan, screenwriter (United Kingdom)

=== Ugo Tognazzi Award for Best Comedy ===
- Philippine Leroy-Beaulieu, actress (France) – president
- Alessandro Aronadio, director and screenwriter (Italy)
- Lisa Nur Sultan, screenwriter (Italy)

=== SIAE Cinema Award ===
- Nicola Guaglianone, screenwriter (Italy) – president
- Carlo Cresto-Dina, film producer (Italy)
- Pivio, Italian composer

== Official sections ==
=== Progressive Cinema Competition – Visions for the World of Tomorrow ===
- Un amor, directed by Isabel Coixet (Spain)
- Achilles, directed by Farhad Delaram (Iran, Germany, France) – first work
- Avant que les flammes ne s'eteignent, directed by Mehdi Fikri (France) – first work
- Black Box, directed by Aslı Özge (Germany, Belgium)
- There's Still Tomorrow, directed by Paola Cortellesi (Italy) – first work – (opening film)
- Like a Son, directed by Nicolas Boukhrief (France)
- En dag kommer allt det här bli ditt, directed by Andreas Öhman (Sweden)
- The Erection of Toribio Bardelli, directed by Adrián Saba (Peru, Brazil)
- Fremont, directed by Babak Jalali (United States)
- Holiday, directed by Edoardo Gabbriellini (Italy)
- The Hypnosis, directed by Ernst De Geer (Sweden, Norway, France) – first work
- My Hair Hurts, directed by Roberta Torre (Italy)
- The Monk and the Gun, directed by Pawo Choyning Dorji (Bhutan, United States, France, Taiwan)
- Toll, directed by Carolina Markowicz (Brazil, Portugal) – first work
- Death Is a Problem for the Living, directed by Teemu Nikki (Finland, Italy)
- A Silence, directed by Joachim Lafosse (Belgium, France, Luxembourg)
- Sweet Sue, directed by Leo Leigh (United Kingdom) – first feature
- Blaga's Lessons, directed by Stephan Komandarev (Bulgaria, Germany)

=== Freestyle ===
==== Film ====
- Accattaroma, directed by Daniele Costantini (Italy)
- They Lost the Pianist, directed by Fernando Trueba and Javier Mariscal (Spain, France) – animation
- The Immortals, directed by Anne Riitta Ciccone (Italy)
- Jeʹvida, directed by Katja Gauriloff (Finland)
- Mother, Couch, directed by Niclas Larsson (United States, Denmark, Sweden) – first work
- The Persian Version, directed by Maryam Keshavarz (United States)
- In Search, directed by Giulio Base (Italy)
- Signs of Life, directed by Leandro Picarella (Italy, Switzerland) – documentary
- Too Blue, directed by Filippo Barbagallo (Italy) – first work
- Wanted, directed by Fabrizio Ferraro (Italy)

==== TV series ====
- The Lions of Sicily, directed by Paolo Genovese, 2 episodes (Italy)
- The Sea Beyond, 4th season, directed by Ivan Silvestrini, 2 episodes (Italy)
- La Storia, directed by Francesca Archibugi, 1 episode (Italy)
- Suburræterna, directed by Ciro D'Emilio and Alessandro Tonda, 2 episodes (Italy)

=== Great Public ===
- A Hundred Sundays, directed by Antonio Albanese (Italy)
- Cottontail, directed by Patrick Dickinson (United Kingdom, Japan) – first feature
- From the Top of a Cold Tower, directed by Francesco Frangipane (Italy) – first work
- Diabolik: Who Are You?, directed by Manetti Bros. (Italy)
- Dream Scenario, directed by Kristoffer Borgli (United States)
- Eileen, directed by William Oldroyd (United States)
- The End We Start From, directed by Mahalia Belo (United Kingdom) – first work
- Et la fête continue, directed by Robert Guédiguian (France, Italy)
- Fingernails, directed by Chrīstos Nikou (United States)
- Gonzo Girl, directed by Patricia Arquette (United States)
- Jules, directed by Marc Turtletaub (United States)
- The Boy and the Heron, directed by Hayao Miyazaki (Japan)
- Winter Lemons, directed by Caterina Carone (Italy, Poland)
- Nuovo Olimpo, directed by Ferzan Özpetek (Italy)
- Palazzina Laf, directed by Michele Riondino (Italy) – first work
- The Performance, directed by Shira Piven (United States)
- The Royal Hotel, directed by Kitty Green (Australia)
- Saltburn, directed by Emerald Fennell (United Kingdom)
- Second Tour, directed by Albert Dupontel (France)
- Te l'avevo detto, directed by Ginevra Elkann (Italy)
- Volare, directed by Margherita Buy (Italy) – first work
- Widow Clicquot, directed by Thomas Napper (France, United Kingdom)

=== Special screenings ===
- The Compass - The Star Collector, directed by Andrea Soldani (Italy) – documentary
- Enigma Rol, directed by Anselma Dell'Olio (Italy) – documentary
- High & Low - John Galliano, directed by Kevin Macdonald (France, United States, United Kingdom) – documentary
- The Empire of Nature. A Night at the Colosseum Park, directed by Luca Lancise and Marco Gentili (Italy) – documentary
- Me, Us and Gaber, directed by Riccardo Milani (Italy) – documentary
- Kripton, directed by Francesco Munzi (Italy) – documentary
- Maria Callas. Letters and Memoirs, directed by Tom Volf and Yannis Dimolitsas (Italy) – documentary
- The Eternal Memory, directed by Maite Alberdi (Chile) – documentary
- Misericordia, directed by Emma Dante (Italy)
- Mur, directed by Kasia Smutniak (Italy) – documentary
- May I Come in? An ode to Naples, directed by Trudie Styler (Italy) – documentary
- Rome, Holy and Damned, directed by Roberto D'Agostino, Marco Giusti and Daniele Ciprì (Italy) – documentary
- Four Fifths, directed by Stefano Urbanetti (Italy) – documentary
- Rule of Two Walls, directed by David Gutnik (Ukraine) – documentary
- Carrozzanti and spiritelli. 50 years of life of the Teatro Franco Parenti, directed by Michele Mally (Italy) – documentary
- Many Faces in Memory, directed by Francesca Comencini (Italy)
- Unfitting, directed by Giovanna Mezzogiorno (Italy) – short film
- Men on the March, directed by Peter Marcias (Italy) – documentary
- Via Sicilia 57/59. Giorgio Albertazzi. Theatre is life, directed by Pino Strabioli and Fabio Masi (Italy) – documentary
- Sugar - Sugar Fornaciari, directed by Valentina Zanella and Giangiacomo De Stefano (Italy) – documentary

=== Absolute beginners ===
- Boatman - Voyage on the Ganges, directed by Gianfranco Rosi (Italy, United States, 1993) – documentary
- Il Camorrista - The Series, directed by Giuseppe Tornatore – TV series, episodes 1 and 4 (Italy, 1986)

=== Best of 2023 ===
- Anatomy of a Fall, directed by Justine Triet (France)
- Catching Fire: The Story of Anita Pallenberg, directed by Alexis Bloom and Svetlana Zill (United States) – documentary
- La chimera, directed by Alice Rohrwacher (Italy, France, Switzerland)
- Eureka, directed by Lisandro Alonso (France, Argentina, Germany, Portugal, Mexico)
- Firebrand, directed by Karim Aïnouz (United Kingdom)
- Kiss the Future, directed by Nenad Cicin-Sain (United States, Ireland) – documentary
- Orlando, My Political Biography, directed by Paul B. Preciado (France) – documentary
- The Taste of Things (La Passion de Dodin Bouffant), directed by Trần Anh Hùng (France)
- Past Lives, directed by Celine Song (United States)
- The Zone of Interest, directed by Jonathan Glazer (United States, United Kingdom, Poland)

=== History of cinema ===
==== Homage to Isabella Rossellini ====
- Animals Distract Me, directed by Isabella Rossellini (United States, 2011) – documentary
- Darwin, What?, directed by Isabella Rossellini, Paul David Magid (Greece, 2020) – short film
- Fox Film, directed by Isabella Rossellini (United States) – short film
- Green Porno, directed by Jody Shapiro and Isabella Rossellini, 18 episodes (United States, 2008-2009) – TV series
- Mammas, directed by Isabella Rossellini, 10 episodes (United States, 2013) – TV series
- Seduce Me, directed by Isabella Rossellini, 10 episodes (United States, 2010) – TV series
- Blue Velvet, directed by David Lynch (United States, 1986)
- Death Becomes Her, directed by Robert Zemeckis (United States, 1992)
- Left Luggage, directed by Jeroen Krabbé (United States, United Kingdom, Netherlands, Belgium, 1998)
- My Dad Is 100 Years Old, directed by Guy Maddin (Canada, 2005) – short film
- The Saddest Music in the World, directed by Guy Maddin (Canada, 2003)
- Another Side of Sunday Isabella Rossellini's Reports from New York – TV Program
- Autumn Sonata, directed by Ingmar Bergman (France, Germany, Sweden, 1978) – chosen by Isabella Rossellini
- Stromboli, directed by Roberto Rossellini (Italy, 1950) – chosen by Isabella Rossellini
- A Season with Isabella Rossellini, directed by Marian Lacombe (France, 2023) – documentary
- La chimera, directed by Alice Rohrwacher (Italy, France, Switzerland) – Best of 2023 section

==== Homage to Shigeru Umebayashi ====
Shigeru Umebayashi is a Japanese composer.

- In the Mood for Love (Fa yeung nin wa), directed by Wong Kar-wai (Hong Kong, 2000)
- House of Flying Daggers (Shí miàn mái fú), directed by Zhang Yimou (China, 2004)
- A Single Man, directed by Tom Ford (United States, 2009)

==== Homage to Maria Grazia Buccella ====
Maria Grazia Buccella is an Italian actress, glamour model and beauty pageant titleholder.

- Just Look at Her, directed by Luciano Salce (Italy, 1970)
- Dismissed on His Wedding Night, directed by Ugo Tognazzi (Italy, 1968)

==== Homage to Jean-Luc Godard ====
Jean-Luc Godard a French and Swiss film director, screenwriter, and film critic.

- Godard par Godard, directed by Florence Platarets (France, 2023) – documentary

==== Tribute to Lorenza Mazzetti ====
Lorenza Mazzetti was an Italian film director, novelist, photographer and painter.

- The Country Doctor, directed by Lorenza Mazzet (USA, 1953) – short film
- K (Metamorphosis), directed by Lorenza Mazzetti (UK, 1954) – short film
- Together, directed by Lorenza Mazzetti (United Kingdom, 1956) – medium-length film
- Together with Lorenza Mazzetti, directed by Brighid Lowe (Argentina, 2023) – documentary

==== Restorations ====
- Hello Nì!, directed by Paolo Poeti (Italy, 1979)
- Folgore Division, directed by Duilio Coletti (Italy, 1954)
- The Way of the Dragon, directed by Bruce Lee (Hong Kong, 1972)
- The Flavor of Green Tea over Rice, directed by Yasujirō Ozu (Japan, 1952)
- The Scent of the Night, directed by Claudio Caligari (Italy, 1998)
- Ovosodo, directed by Paolo Virzì (Italy, 1997)
- Underground, directed by Emir Kusturica (Yugoslavia, Germany, France, Hungary, Czech Republic, 1995)

==== Documentaries ====
- American Badass: A Michael Madsen Retrospective, directed by Dominique Milano (United States)
- Chambre 999, directed by Lubna Playoust (France)
- Une chronique americanine, directed by Alexandre Gouzo and Jean-Claude Taki (France)
- Fellini, l'entretien retrouvé, directed by Jean-Christophe Rosé (France)
- Me, the Pipe and the Pizzas, directed by Ugo Gregoretti (Italy)
- Joseph Losey, l'outsider, directed by Dante Desarthe (France)
- Kennedy in Rome, directed by Ciro Giorgini (Italy, 1999)
- He was Trinity, directed by Dario Marani (Italy)
- Our Monument Valley, directed by Alberto Crespi and Steve Della Casa (Italy)
- Deep Silver, directed by Giancarlo Rolandi and Steve Della Casa (Italy)
- That Damned Film About Virzì, directed by Stefano Petti (Italy)
- The Return of Maciste, directed by Maurizio Sciarra (Italy)
- The Voice Without a Face, directed by Filippo Soldi (Italy)

== Awards and winners ==
- Lifetime Achievement Award
  - Shigeru Umebayashi
  - Isabella Rossellini

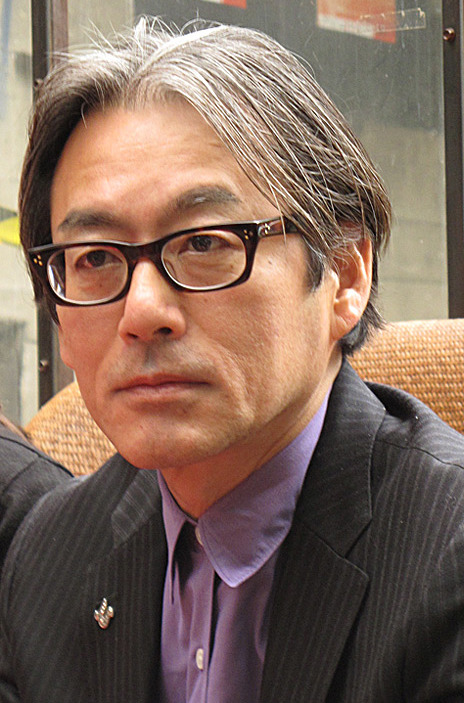
Shigeru Umebayashi, Lifetime Achievement Award

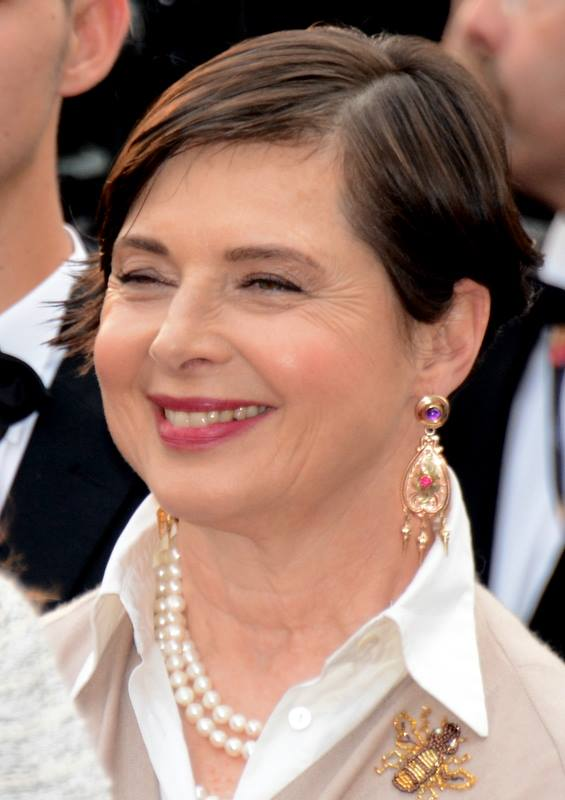
Isabella Rossellini, Lifetime Achievement Award

- Progressive Lifetime Achievement Award
  - Haley Bennett
  - Camila Morrone

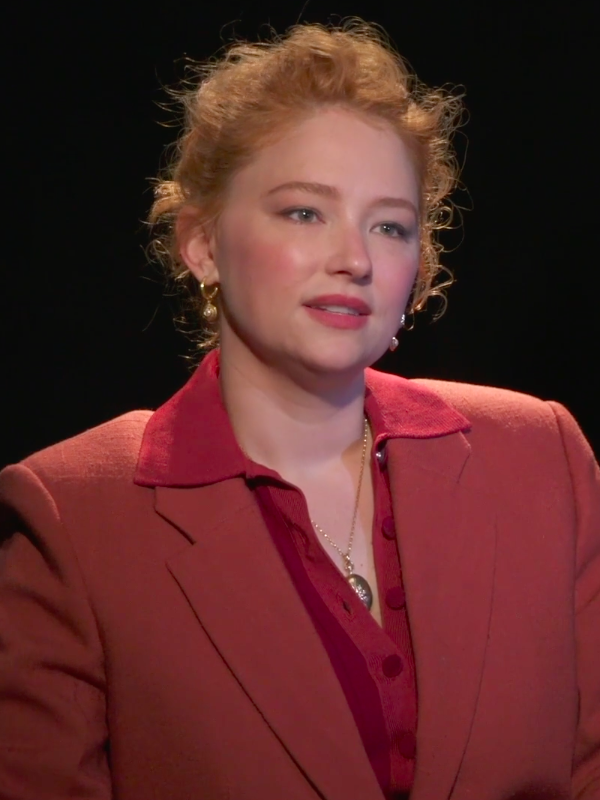
Haley Bennett, Progressive Lifetime Achievement Award

=== Progressive Cinema Competition ===
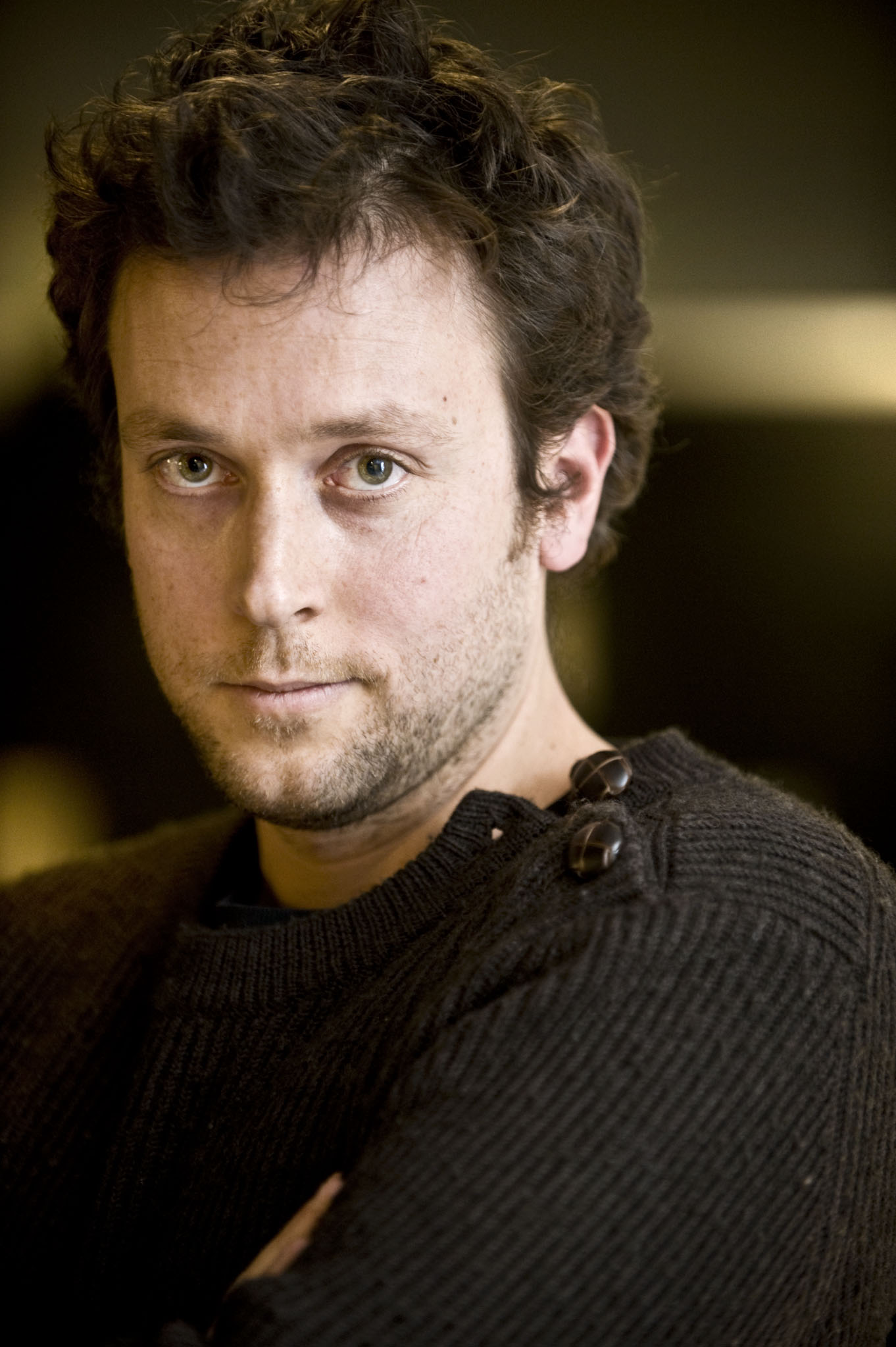
Joachim Lafosse, Best Director Award

  - Best Film: Toll by Carolina Markowicz, Brazil, Portugal
  - Grand Jury Prize: Blaga's Lessons by Stephan Komandarev, Bulgaria, Germany
  - Best Director: Joachim Lafosse for A Silence, Belgium, France, Luxembourg
  - Monica Vitti Prize for Best Actress: Alba Rohrwacher for Mi fanno male i capelli, Italy
  - Vittorio Gassman Prize for Best Actor: Herbert Nordrum, The Hypnosis, Sweden, Norway, France
  - Best Screenplay: Asli Özge for Black Box, Germany, Belgium
  - Special Jury Prizes
    - Achilles, Farhad Delaram, Iran, Germany, France
    - There's Still Tomorrow, Paola Cortellesi, Italy
    - The Monk and the Gun, Pawo Choyning Dorji, Bhutan, France USA, Taiwan
- BNL BNP Paribas Prize for Best First Film: Cottontail, Patrick Dickinson (United Kingdom, Japan)
- Special Mentions
  - There's Still Tomorrow, Paola Cortellesi
  - After the Fire, Mehdi Fikri, France
- "Ugo Tognazzi" Prize for Best Comedy Jules, Marc Turtletaub (United States)
- Special Mention Asta Kamma August, Herbert Nordrum for The Hypnosis
- Audience Award There's Still Tomorrow, Paola Cortellesi
- SIAE Cinema Prize Il primo figlio, Mara Fondacaro, Italy

=== Alice nella città ===
- Best Film: The Other Son, Juan Sebastián Quebrada, Colombia, France, Argentina
- Raffaella Fioretta Prize for Best Italian Film in the Panorama Italy Competition Desiré, Mario Vezza, Italy
- Special Jury Prize Bangarang, Giulio Mastromauro, Italy
- 'The Hollywood Reporter Rome Prize To Leslie Michael Morris, United States
- Special Mention for Best Actor Miguel Gonzalez for The Other Son
- Special Mention for Best Actress Mia McKenna-Bruce for How to Have Sex, United Kingdom, Greece, Belgium
- Special Mention for Progressive Direction Gianluca Santoni for Io e il secco, Italy, Costa Rica
- RB Casting Prize for Best Young Italian Actor Amanda Campana for Suspicious Minds, Italy, France
- Onde Corte Audience Award Fake Shot, Francesco Castellaneta, Italy

Shorts Film Days

- SIAE Prize for Best Project Presented in the Unbox Laboratory Chiedo scusa, Francesco Piras, Italy
