= Women in Bhutan =

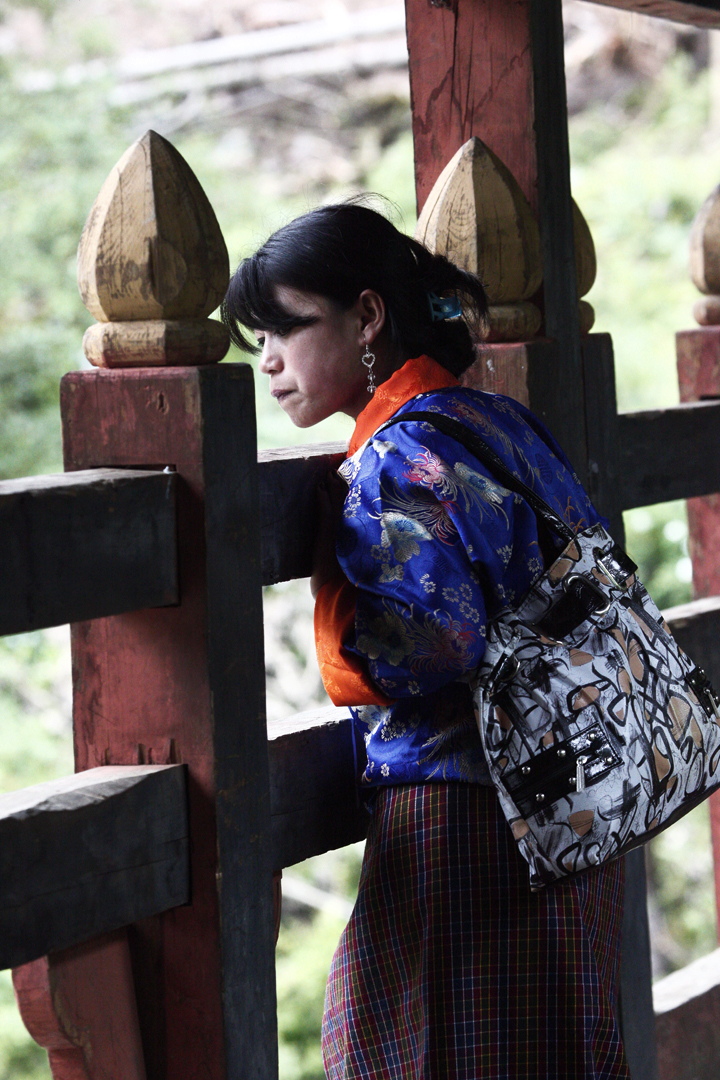
- Woman in Bhutan, 2011

General statistics
- Maternal mortality (per 100,000): 180 (2010)
- Women in parliament: 13.9% (2012)
- Women over 25 with secondary education: 34.0% (2010)
- Women in labour force: 65.8% (2011)

Gender Inequality Index
- Value: 0.415 (2021)
- Rank: 98th out of 191

Global Gender Gap Index
- Value: 0.663 (2025)
- Rank: 119th out of 148

Economic development in the country of Bhutan has increased opportunities for women to participate in fields such as medicine (both as physicians and nurses), teaching, and administration. Women were providing more labor than men in all sectors of the economy. Less than 4 percent of the total female work force was unemployed, compared with nearly 10 percent of men who had no occupation. In particular, nearly 10 percent of government employees were women by 1989. During their government careers, women civil servants were allowed three months of maternity leave with full pay for three deliveries and leave without pay for any additional deliveries.

Although women elected to office remained relatively few (14% before local elections according to the UNHCR), more than half of voters in initial local government elections were women. This has raised the question of whether women would benefit from quotas in public service.

In 1981, the government founded the National Women's Association of Bhutan to improve the socioeconomic status of women, particularly those in rural areas.

== Economic participation ==
Economic development has increased opportunities for women to participate in fields such as medicine, both as physicians and nurses; teaching; and administration. By 1989 nearly 10 percent of government employees were women.

Reflecting the dominance of males in society, girls were outnumbered three to two in primary and secondary-level schools. With many pro-women organizations on the rise including CSO, MBO etc. women have been seen to be contributing towards livelihoods of individual families. For instance SABAH-Bhutan tries to empower women in earning through weaving, tailoring food processing and other economic activities, thereby making women participate in earning for the family(s).

== Political participation ==
Between 2008 and 2011, recruitment and retention of Tshogpas, or local government council members, remained a serious issue. Obstacles range from lack of interest and lack of economic incentives to difficulty in compliance and obtaining accreditation under existing election laws. The functional literacy and skills test alone left many constituencies without the minimum of two candidates, leading to lengthy delay of the local government elections of 2011, originally slated for 2008.

The first round of the functional literacy and skills test left many Gewogs with no representatives, though second round results showed a pass rate over 90%. Although women elected to office remained relatively few (14% before local elections according to the UNHCR), more than half of voters in initial local government elections were women. In initial local-level voting in 2011, voter turnout was about 50%. This has raised the question of whether women would benefit from quotas in public service, highlighting the need to encourage further female electoral and political participation.

== History ==
Women in the 1980s played a significant role in the agricultural work force, where they outnumbered men, who were leaving for the service sector and other urban industrial and commercial activities. In the mid-1980s, 95 percent of all Bhutanese women from the ages of fifteen to sixty-four years were involved in agricultural work, compared with only 78 percent of men in the same age range. Foreign observers have noted that women shared equally with men in farm labor. Overall, women were providing more labor than men in all sectors of the economy. Less than 4 percent of the total female work force was unemployed, compared with nearly 10 percent of men who had no occupation.

The government founded the National Women's Association of Bhutan (which Dawa Dem helped establish) in 1981 primarily to improve the socioeconomic status of women, particularly those in rural areas. The association, at its inaugural session, declared that it would not push for equal rights for women because the women of Bhutan had already come to "enjoy equal status with men politically, economically, and socially." To give prominence to the association, the Druk Gyalpo's sister, Ashi Sonam Chhoden Wangchuck, was appointed its president. Starting in 1985, the association became a line item in the government budget and was funded at Nu2.4 million in fiscal year 1992. The association has organized annual beauty contests featuring traditional arts and culture, fostered training in health and hygiene, distributed yarn and vegetable seeds, and introduced smokeless stoves in villages.

=== Traditional marriage and family life ===
The traditional practice, arranged marriages based on family and ethnic ties, had been replaced in the late twentieth century with marriages based on mutual affection. Marriages were usually arranged by the partners in contemporary Bhutan, and the minimum age was sixteen for women and twenty-one for men. The institution of child marriage, once relatively widespread, largely declined as Bhutan modernized, and there were only remnants of the practice in the late twentieth century.

Interethnic marriages, once forbidden, were encouraged in the late 1980s by an incentive of a Nu10,000 government stipend to willing couples. The stipend was discontinued in 1991. Marriages of Bhutanese citizens to foreigners have been discouraged. Bhutanese with foreign spouses were not allowed to obtain civil service positions and could have their government scholarships cancelled and be required to repay portions already received. Foreign spouses were not entitled to citizenship by right but had to apply for naturalization.

Polyandry is rare and can still be found for instance among the Brokpas of Merak-Sakten. A woman married by custom to several husbands will, however, be granted only one marriage certificate according to law. Polygamy in Bhutan was restricted in the mid-twentieth century. Through the 1990s the law still allowed a man as many as three wives, providing he had the first wife's permission. The first wife also had the power to sue for divorce and alimony if she did not agree. In the 1980s, divorce was common, and newer laws provided better benefits to women seeking alimony.

Family life, both traditionally and through the end of the 20th century, was likely to provide for a fair amount of self-sufficiency. Families, for example, often made their own clothing, bedding, floor and seat covers, tablecloths, and decorative items for daily and religious use. Wool was the primary material, but domestic silk and imported cotton were also used in weaving colorful cloth, often featuring elaborate geometric, floral, and animal designs. Although weaving was normally done by women of all ages using family-owned looms, monks sometimes did embroidery and appliqué work. In the twentieth century, weaving was possibly as predominant a feature of daily life as it was at the time of Bhutan's unification in the seventeenth century.

Landholdings varied depending on the wealth and size of individual families, but most families had as much land as they could farm using traditional techniques. A key element of family life was the availability of labor. Thus, the choice of the home of newlyweds was determined by which parental unit had the greatest need of supplemental labor. If both families had a sufficient supply of labor, then a bride and groom might elect to set up their own home.

== See also ==
- Kunzang Choden, Bhutanese author who focuses on the experience of women
- Polygamy in Bhutan
- Night hunting, traditional "courtship" practice
- Abortion in Bhutan
- Women in Asia
