= Kunzang Choden =

Bhutanese writer

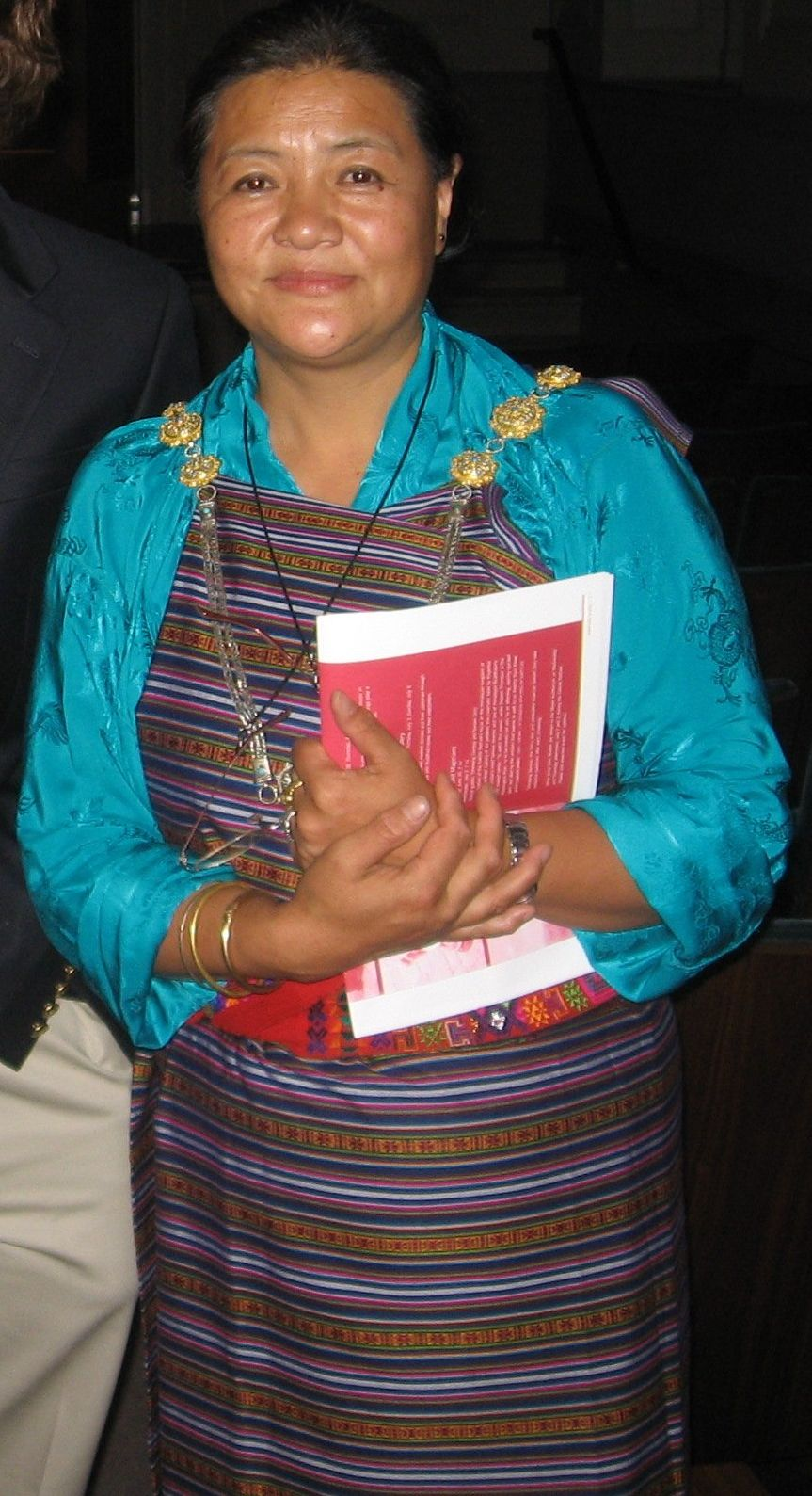
- Choden after a book reading in Washington, DC.
- Born: 1952 (age 73–74); Tang, Bumthang, Bhutan
- Education: University of Nebraska–Lincoln
- Occupation: Writer
- Children: 2 daughters, 1 son
- Writing career
- Notable works: The Circle of Karma (2005), Bhutanese Tales of the Yeti (1997), Folktales of Bhutan (1994)
- Website: www.zubaanbooks.com/zubaan_author_details.asp?AuthorID=16

Kunzang Choden (Dzongkha: ཀུན་བཟང་ཆོས་སྒྲོན།; born 1952) is a Bhutanese writer. She is the first Bhutanese woman to write a novel in English.

Choden was born in Bumthang District. Her parents were feudal landlords. At the age of nine, her father sent her to school in India, where she learned English. She has a BA Honours in Psychology from Indraprastha College in Delhi and a BA in Sociology from the University of Nebraska–Lincoln. She has worked for the United Nations Development Program in Bhutan. She and her Swiss husband currently live in Thimphu.

The Circle of Karma, published by Zubaan Publishers Pvt. Ltd in 2005, is her first novel. It takes place in the 1950s, the initial period of imperially regulated modernization in Bhutan. The main character, a Bhutanese woman and road-builder by occupation, is forced to deal both with the traditional, restrictive gender roles of pre-modern Bhutan and the new kinds of sexism developing as men gain economic freedom. Much of the novel is also set in North India.

In 2012, Choden and her family founded the publishing house, Riyang Books, in Thimphu.

During the 2020 COVID-19 pandemic, Choden's film-maker daughter, Dechen Roder, made video recordings of her mother reading her stories and posted them to YouTube for children stuck at home during the lockdown.

== Bibliography ==
- Folktales of Bhutan (1994) ISBN 974-8495-96-5
- Bhutanese Tales of the Yeti (1997) ISBN 1-879155-83-4
- Dawa: The Story of a Stray Dog in Bhutan (2004) ISBN 99936-644-0-5
- The Circle of Karma (2005) ISBN 81-86706-79-8
- Chilli and Cheese- Food and Society in Bhutan (2008) ISBN 978-974-480-118-0
- Tales in Colour and other stories (2009) ISBN 978-81-89884-62-8
- Membar Tsho - The Flaming Lake (2012) ISBN 9993689912
