= KLK =

KLK may refer to:

- Kallikrein
- Kalokol Airport, Kenya, by IATA code
- Kill la Kill, Japanese anime television series
- KLK (song), a song by Venezuelan musician Arca, featuring Rosalía
- KLK anImagine, precursor of Bhutanese animation
- Kono language (Nigeria), by ISO 639 code
- Kuala Lumpur Kepong Berhad, Malaysian multi-national company
