= 50th Telluride Film Festival =

American film festival

- Location: Telluride, Colorado, United States
- Founded: 1974
- Awards: Telluride Film Festival Silver Medallion: Yorgos Lanthimos; Alice Rohrwacher; Wim Wenders
- Artistic director: Julie Huntsinger
- Festival date: August 31 – September 4, 2023
- Website: telluridefilmfestival.org
- 51st 49th

The 50th Telluride Film Festival took place from August 31 to September 4, 2023, in Telluride, Colorado.

Marking the fiftieth edition of the festival, Alfonso Cuarón, Adam Curtis, Ethan Hawke, Rachel Kushner, Steve McQueen, and Mira Nair, all of them past guests, were invited to return as Guest Directors.

The Telluride Film Festival Silver Medallion was presented to Greek filmmaker Yorgos Lanthimos, Italian filmmaker Alice Rohrwacher, and German filmmaker Wim Wenders. While The Film Foundation was the recipient of the Special Medallion.

The poster for Telluride Film Festival's fiftieth anniversary, designed by Luke Dorman, was released in July 2023. Dorman is the Principal Graphic Designer at Meow Wolf.

== Official selection ==
The official line-up was announced, as usual, on the day before the festival's official opening.

=== Main Program ===
The following films were selected to be screened:

English title	Original title	Director(s)	Production Country
All of Us Strangers		Andrew Haigh	United Kingdom
American Symphony		Matthew Heineman	United States
Anatomy of a Fall	Anatomie d'une chute	Justine Triet	France
Anselm	Anselm – Das Rauschen der Zeit	Wim Wenders	Germany
Baltimore		Joe Lawlor and Christine Molloy	Ireland, United Kingdom
Beyond Utopia		Madeleine Gavin	United States
The Bikeriders		Jeff Nichols	United States
Cassandro		Roger Ross Williams	United States
La Chimera		Alice Rohrwacher	Italy, France, Switzerland
El Conde		Pablo Larraín	Chile
Daddio		Christy Hall	United States
Fallen Leaves	Kuolleet lehdet	Aki Kaurismäki	Finland, Germany
The Falling Star		Dominique Abel and Fiona Gordon	France, Belgium
Finally Dawn	Finalmente l'alba	Saverio Costanzo	Italy
Fingernails		Christos Nikou	United States
Food, Inc. 2		Robert Kenner and Melissa Robledo	United States
High & Low – John Galliano		Kevin Macdonald	United Kingdom
The Holdovers		Alexander Payne	United States
Hollywoodgate		Ibrahim Nash'at	United States, Germany
Janet Planet		Annie Baker	United States
The Mission		Amanda McBaine and Jesse Moss	United States
The Monk and the Gun		Pawo Choyning Dorji	Bhutan
Nyad		Jimmy Chin and Elizabeth Chai Vasarhelyi	United States
Occupied City		Steve McQueen	Netherlands, United Kingdom, United States
Orlando, My Political Biography	Orlando, ma biographie politique	Paul B. Preciado	France
Perfect Days		Wim Wenders	Japan, Germany
The Pigeon Tunnel		Errol Morris	United Kingdom
Poor Things		Yorgos Lanthimos	United States, United Kingdom, Ireland
The Promised Land	Bastarden	Nikolaj Arcel	Denmark, Germany, Sweden
The Royal Hotel		Kitty Green	Australia, United Kingdom
Rustin		George C. Wolfe	United States
Saltburn		Emerald Fennell	United States, United Kingdom
The Teachers' Lounge	Das Lehrerzimmer	İlker Çatak	Germany
Tehachapi		JR	France
Thank You Very Much		Alex Braverman	United States
Tuesday		Daina O. Pusić	United Kingdom, United States
Wildcat		Ethan Hawke	United States
The Zone of Interest		Jonathan Glazer	United States, United Kingdom, Poland
Episodic Form and Short Form
If Dreams Were Lighting		Ramin Bahrani	United States
Incident		Bill Morrison	United States
The Last Repair Shop		Ben Proudfoot and Kris Bowers	United States
Last Song From Kabul		Kevin Macdonald	Afghanistan, Qatar, Portugal, Germany

=== Sneak Previews ===
The following films were selected to be screened:

English title	Original title	Director(s)	Production Country
The Taste of Things	La Passion de Dodin Bouffant	Anh Hung Tran	France
Tótem		Lila Avilés	Mexico, Denmark, France
They Shot the Piano Player	Dispararon al pianista	Javier Mariscal and Fernando Trueba	Spain, France, Netherlands

=== Guest Directors' Selection ===
The following films were selected to be screened by this year guest directors (Alfonso Cuarón, Adam Curtis, Ethan Hawke, Rachel Kushner, Steve McQueen, and Mira Nair):

Selected by	English title	Original title	Director(s)	Production Country
Adam Curtis	The Long Good Friday (1980)		John Mackenzie	United Kingdom
Alfonso Cuarón	Jonah Who Will Be 25 on the Year 2000 (1976)	Jonas qui aura 25 ans en l'an 2000	Alain Tanner	France, Switzerland
Ethan Hawke	All That Jazz (1979)		Bob Fosse	United States
Mira Nair	The Music Room (1958)	Jalsaghar	Satyajit Ray	India
Rachel Kushner	Juvenile Court (1973)		Frederick Wiseman	United States
Steve McQueen	Zero for Conduct (1933)	Zéro de Conduite	Jean Vigo	France

=== Special Screenings ===
The following films were selected to be screened:

English title	Original title	Director(s)	Production Country
The Golden West		Ross White, Tom Berkeley	Ireland, United Kingdom
Reality		Tina Satter	United States
Strange Way of Life (short)	Extraña forma de vida	Pedro Almodóvar	Spain

=== Film Restorations ===
The following films were selected to be screened:

English title	Original title	Director(s)	Production Country
The Wheel (1923)	La Roue	Abel Gance	France
The Unknown (1927)		Tod Browning	United States
My Grandmother (1929)	Chemi bebia	Kote Mikaberidze	Soviet Union
Victims of Sin (1951)	Víctimas del pecado	Emilio Fernández	Mexico
Llévame en tus brazos (1955)		Julio Bracho	Mexico
The Film Foundation Restorations
Black Panthers (1970) (short)		Agnès Varda	France, United States
Downpour (1972)	رگبار	Bahram Beyzaie	Iran
The Gleaners & I (2000)	Les glaneurs et la glaneuse	Agnès Varda	France
Uncle Yanco (1968)	Oncle Yanco	Agnès Varda	France, United States
Yam Daabo (1987)		Idrissa Ouédraogo	Burkina Faso

=== Backlot ===
English title	Original title	Director(s)	Production Country
Tarpon (1973)		Guy de la Valdene, Christian Odasso	United States
All That Is Sacred		Scott Ballew	United States
AKA Mr. Chow		Nick Hooker	United States
Angel Applicant		Ken Meyer	United States
Carol Doda Topless at the Condor		Marlo McKenzie, Jonathan Parker	United States
Cinema Has Been My True Love: The Works and Times of Lynda Myles		Mark Cousins	United Kingdom
Kim's Video		David Redmon, Ashley Sabin	United States, United Kingdom, Italy
Little Girl Blue		Mona Achache	France
Musica!		Rob Epstein, Jeffrey Friedman	United States
Notes from Sheepland		Cara Holmes	Ireland
Room 999	Chambre 999	Lubna Playoust	France
Zinzindurrunkarratz		Oskar Alegría	Spain

=== Filmmakers of Tomorrow Official Selection ===
==== Student Prints ====
Curated and introduced by Gregory Nava

English title	Original title	Director(s)	Production Country / University
Comadre		Nichole Chi	United States (University of Texas at Austin)
Imogene		Katie Blair	United States (Columbia University)
So They Say		Natalia Luque	Chile (Columbia University)
Jardines		Alfredo Torres	Mexico (UC Berkeley Graduate School of Journalism)
Je Me Souviens		Raphaël Benoit	United States (New York University)

==== Calling Cards ====
Curated and introduced by Barry Jenkins.

English title	Original title	Director(s)	Production Countrie(s)
Heat Spell	L'Été des chaleurs	Marie-Pier Dupuis	Canada
In Dreams		Josh Shaffner	United States
The Heart		Malia Ann	United States
Into the Blue		Ömer Sami	Denmark
27		Flóra Anna Buda	France, Hungary

==== Great Expectations ====
Curated and introduced by Barry Jenkins.

English title	Original title	Director(s)	Production Countrie(s)
Those Next to Us		Bernhard Hetzenauer	Switzerland, Germany, Mexico, Austria
Ardent Other		Alice Brygo	France
Taxibol		Tommaso Santambrogio	Italy

== Official Awards ==
=== Silver Medallion ===
The Silver Medallion Awards is given to recognize an artist's significant contribution to the world of cinema.

- Yorgos Lanthimos
- Alice Rohrwacher
- Wim Wenders

=== Special Medallion ===
The Special Medallion celebrates a hero of cinema who preserves, honors and presents essential, meaningful films.

- The Film Foundation
