= Luke Dorman =

Luke Dorman is the principal designer of Santa Fe-based Meow Wolf. He designed the poster for the 2021 Telluride Film Festival, as well as the 2023 50th Telluride Film Festival. He has also taught at the Santa Fe University of Art and Design.

Dorman's style straddles fine art, graphic design, and illustration. His work has earned recognition from Print magazine, Communication Arts, and the Society for Typographic Arts.
