= Tandin Bidha =

Bhutanese film actress

- རྟ་མགྲིན་བུ་དར།
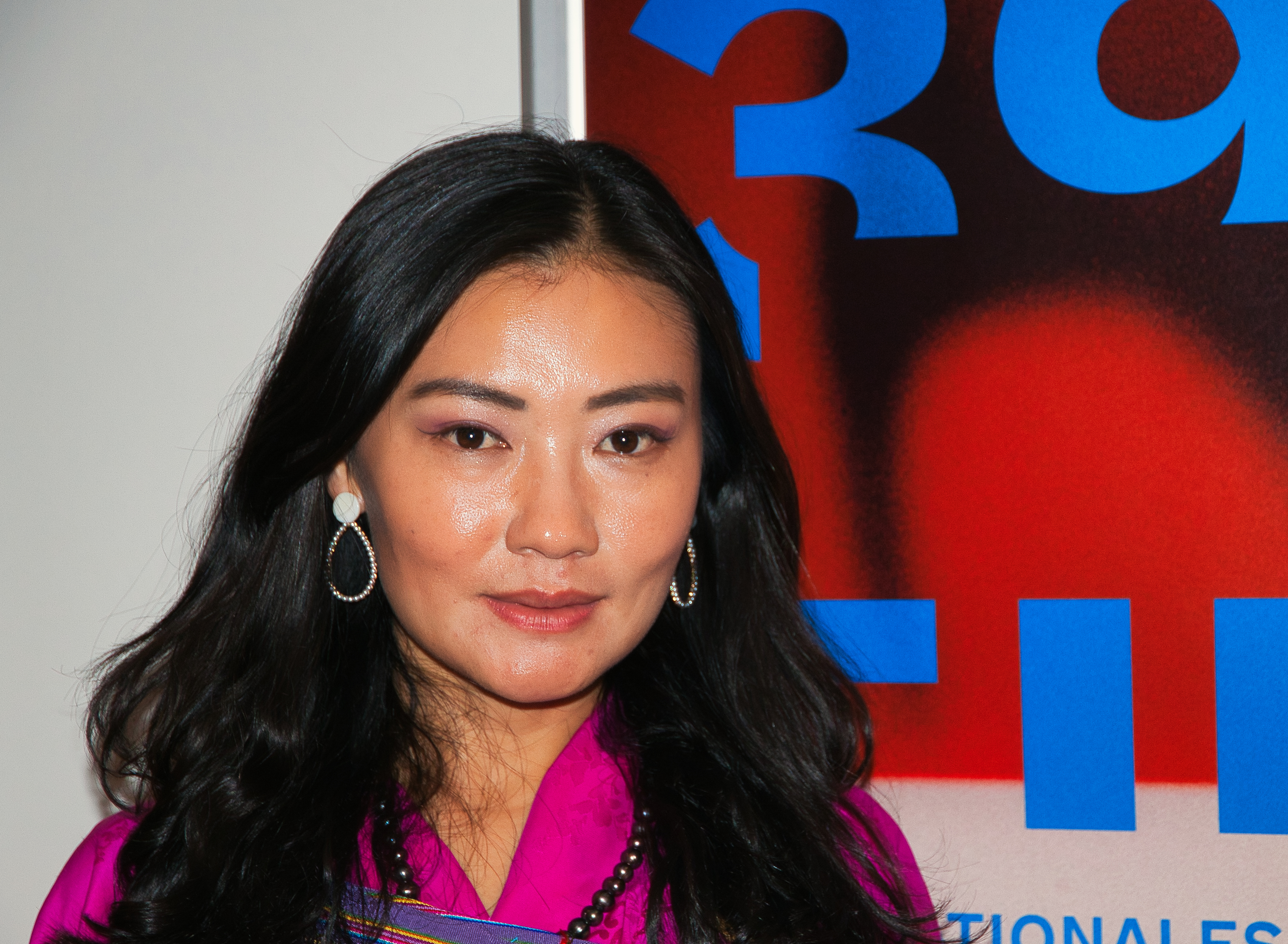
- Tandin Bidha in 2025
- Occupation: Actress · Model
- Notable work: · Chi Sem Chi Lu (2010) · Boom Batha Chenmi Renzi (2016)
- Television: The Voice of Bhutan
- Awards: · Actor Female (16th National Film Awards (2016) · Best Female Actor (2010, for Chi Sem Chi Lu)

Tandin Bidha (Dzongkha: རྟ་མགྲིན་བུ་དར) is a Bhutanese film actress and producer. She has acted in over 30 films till date. She first appeared in “Home sweet Home”.

== Filmography ==
Year	Film	Language	Award
2024	I, the Song	Dzongkha	Best Actress
2022	A Glimmer of Hope	Dzongkha	No
2020	Ruebi	Dzongkha	No
2019	Udumvara	Dzongkha	
	Tsib Choelo	Dzongkha	
2017	Drakcin Gyalmo	Dzongkha	
2016	Chhag Tshelo	Dzongkha	
	Boom Batha Chenmi Renzi	Dzongkha	Actor female (16th National Film Awards)
	Dzongkha	Dzongkha	Gatey Yoeh???
2015	Shengchangma	Dzongkha	

== Other work ==
Bidha was one of the speakers or anchors alongside fellow actor Chencho Dorji for The Voice of Bhutan, a national singing competition. She was the voice for Sheldon, a cartoon series and the present from the Prince to the children of Bhutan, initiated by the Prime Minister of Bhutan, Dasho Lotay Tshering.
