= Bhutanese animation =

Type of film industry in Bhutan

Bhutanese animation is a relatively new industry in Bhutan. Local animations have been primarily used for public awareness campaigns about relevant social, economical, and political issues or as a means to promote local culture. Bhutanese animators and clients view the use of animation in public awareness as more effective than brochures and pamphlets. Ap Naka is an example of a Bhutanese animated public awareness video which seeks to educate people on earthquake preparedness.

Pema Tshering D made the first Bhutanese 3D-animated film, which was released in 2001. Tshering's first animation was that of a beetle dance, and his first public awareness video was Oye Penjor. In 2005, KLK anImagine and Druk Vision Studio, which are major animation studios in Bhutan, were established. KLK is owned by Kinga Sithup, and Druk Vision Studio is owned by Pema Tshering D. The first local 2D animation was by KLK, which was an awareness campaign on rubella, while the first 3D animation, Oye Penjor, was about AIDS and took around three months to produce. It is a common practice among Bhutanese animators to split 10 pictures into 25 frames or to animate in 24 pictures per second. By 2008, Druk Vision Studio had produced around seven animation films, and KLK had done around 20.

The first 3D full length animation film, produced by Athang Animation Studio (established in 2010), was Ap Bokto. It was first screened to the public in September 2014.
