= A Silence =

2023 film by Joachim Lafosse

- Theatrical release poster
- French: Un silence
- Directed by: Joachim Lafosse
- Written by: Joachim Lafosse; Thomas Van Zuylen
- Produced by: Anton Iffland-Stettner; Eva Kuperman; Jani Thiltges; Régine Vial; Alexis Dantec; Antonino Lombardo
- Starring: Daniel Auteuil; Emmanuelle Devos
- Cinematography: Jean-François Hensgens
- Edited by: Damien Keyeux
- Production companies: Stenola Productions; Samsa Film; Les Films du Losange; Prime Time; RTBF; Proximus; VOO; BE TV; France 3 Cinéma
- Distributed by: Les Films du Losange (France); Samsa Film (Luxembourg); Cinéart (Belgium)
- Release dates: 25 September 2023 (San Sebastián); 10 January 2024 (France); 17 January 2024 (Luxembourg); 24 January 2024 (Belgium)
- Running time: 99 minutes
- Countries: Belgium; Luxembourg; France
- Language: French
- Box office: $1.9 million

A Silence (French: Un silence) is a 2023 drama film directed by Joachim Lafosse, co-written by Lafosse and Thomas Van Zuylen. Starring Daniel Auteuil and Emmanuelle Devos, it is loosely based on the real case of disgraced Belgian lawyer Victor Hissel.

The film had its world premiere in the main competition of the 71st San Sebastián International Film Festival on 25 September 2023. It was theatrically released in France on 10 January 2024 by Les Films du Losange, and in Belgium on 24 January by Cinéart.

== Premise ==
"Having remained silent for 25 years, Astrid, the wife of a prominent lawyer, sees her family's equilibrium shatter when her children initiate their quest for justice."

== Cast ==
- Daniel Auteuil as François Schaar
- Emmanuelle Devos as Astrid Schaar
- Matthieu Galoux as Raphaël Schaar
- Jeanne Cherhal as Inspector Colin
- Louise Chevillotte as Caroline
- Nicolas Buysse as Gillet
- Karim Barras as Barras
- Larisa Faber as Christelle Guérin
- Baptiste Sornin as Etienne Guérin
- Shann Case as Shann
- Massimo Riggi as Reporter 1
- Colette Kieffer as Reporter 2
- Elsa Rauchs as Reporter 3
- Jonas Wertz as Reporter 4
- Ismaël Michiels as Ismaël
- Damien Bonnard as Pierre
- Magali Pinglaut as François Schaar's lawyer
- Laure Hemmer as Barrister
- Raphaëlle Bruneau as Mrs. Sautiaux

== Production ==
The screenplay was written chiefly by Lafosse with Thomas Van Zuylen. Chloé Duponchelle and Paul Ismaël served as co-writers. Sarah Chiche, Matthieu Reynaert, and Valérie Graeven are credited as writing collaborators.

A Silence is a co-production between Stenola Productions (Belgium), Samsa Film (Luxembourg), Les Films du Losange (France) and Prime Time (Belgium). It was co-produced by RTBF, Proximus, VOO, BE TV and France 3 Cinéma.

== Release ==
A Silence was selected to compete for the Golden Shell at the 71st San Sebastián International Film Festival, where the film had its world premiere on 25 September 2023.

World sales are handled by Les Films du Losange, which also distributed the film in France on 10 January 2024. Samsa Film distributed the film in Luxembourg on 17 January 2024. Cinéart is set to theatrically release the film in Belgium on 24 January 2024.

== Reception ==
=== Critical response ===
On the review aggregator website Rotten Tomatoes, the film holds an approval rating of 82% based on 17 reviews, with an average rating of 7/10. On AlloCiné, the film received an average rating of 3.5 out of 5 stars, based on 28 reviews from French critics.

Guy Lodge of Variety wrote that "there is a gasping power to its staggered reveals, and a searching sadness to the emerging family portrait that outweighs the film's shock factor".

=== Accolades ===
Award	Date of ceremony	Category	Recipient(s)	Result	Ref.
San Sebastián International Film Festival	30 September 2023	Golden Shell	Joachim Lafosse	Nominated	
Rome Film Festival	28 October 2023	Best Director	Joachim Lafosse	Won	
