= The Pigeon Tunnel =

2023 British film by Errol Morris

- Film poster
- Directed by: Errol Morris
- Produced by: Dominic Crossley-Holland; Steven Hathaway; Simon Cornwell; Stephen Cornwell
- Cinematography: Igor Martinovic
- Edited by: Steven Hathaway
- Music by: Philip Glass; Paul Leonard-Morgan
- Production companies: The Ink Factory; Fourth Floor Productions; Jago Films; Storyteller Productions; 127 Wall Productions
- Distributed by: Apple TV+; Dogwoof
- Release dates: 1 September 2023 (Telluride); 20 October 2023
- Running time: 94 minutes
- Country: United Kingdom
- Language: English

The Pigeon Tunnel is a 2023 British documentary film directed by Errol Morris. It follows the life and career of John le Carré.

It had its world premiere at the 50th Telluride Film Festival on 1 September 2023. It received critical acclaim and was named one of the top 5 documentary films of 2023 by the National Board of Review.

== Plot ==
The film explores the life and career of John le Carré.

== Production ==
In July 2023, it was announced Errol Morris had directed a documentary revolving around John le Carré, with Apple TV+ set to distribute.

== Release ==
The film had its world premiere at the 50th Telluride Film Festival on 1 September 2023. It also screened at the Toronto International Film Festival on 11 September 2023. It was released on 20 October 2023.

== Reception ==
On the review aggregator website Rotten Tomatoes, 96% of 84 critics' reviews are positive, with an average rating of 8/10. The website's consensus reads: "Enthralling for fans as well as those who've never read one of his bestsellers, The Pigeon Tunnel pulls back the curtain on a master of the espionage thriller." On Metacritic, another aggregator, the film holds a weighted average score of 79 out of 100 based on 20 critics, indicating "universal acclaim".
