= Lake Tengrela =

Lake in Banfora, Cascades Region, Burkina Faso

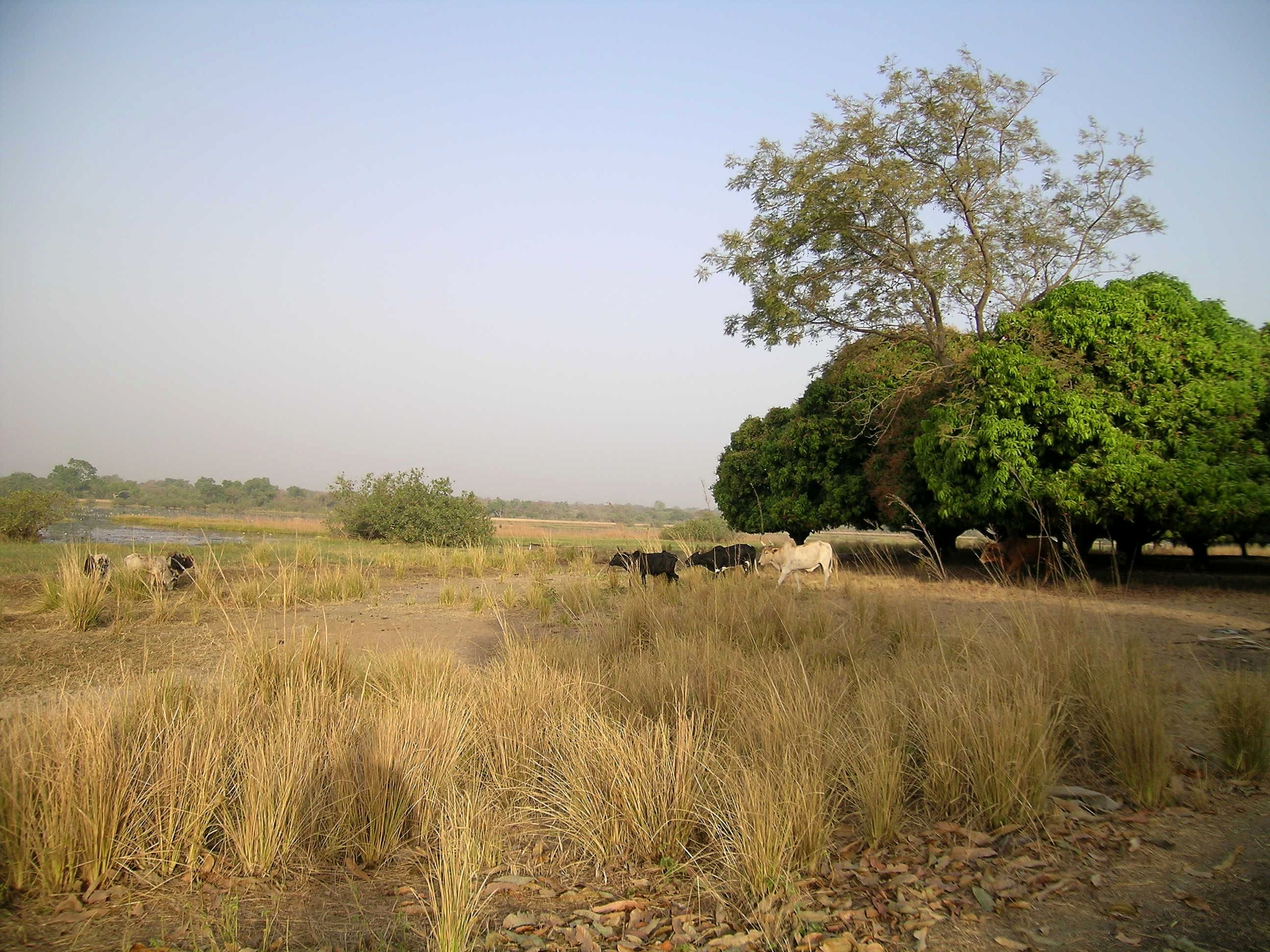

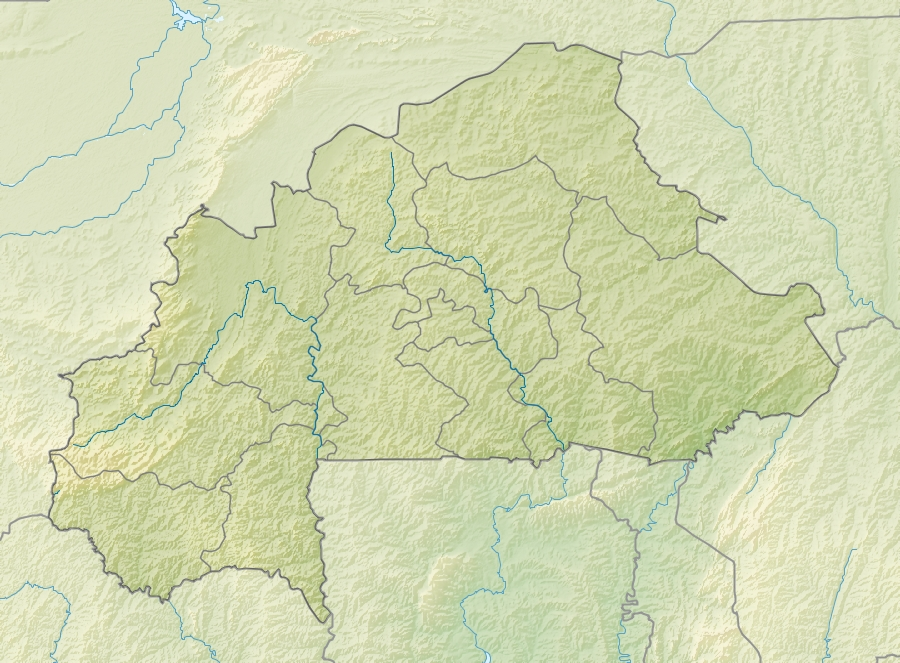
- Location within Burkina Faso
- Coordinates: 10.639689°N 4.808578°W
- Basin countries: Burkina Faso
- Max. length: 2 km (1.2 mi)
- Max. width: 1.5 km (0.93 mi)

Ramsar Wetland
- Official name: Lac de Tingrela
- Designated: 7 October 2009
- Reference no.: 1881

Lake Tengrela is a small lake near Banfora in Burkina Faso. It is known for its hippopotamuses. Locals believe that these hippopotamuses do not attack humans because they are sacred hippopotamuses. Crocodiles are almost never seen in this lake. It is 2 km long and 1.5 km wide.
