= Polygamy in Bhutan =

Polygamy is legal in Bhutan regarding the consent of future wives. There is no legal recognition granted to polygamous spouses under civil law of Bhutan or customary law. Women in Bhutan may by custom be married to several husbands, however they are allowed only one legal husband. The legal status of married couples among polygynous and polyandrous households impacts the division of property upon divorce and survivorship, as well as general admissibility of the marital relationship in courts.

== Extent ==
Both polygyny and polyandry are dying out in Bhutan. Polyandry is only present in certain areas, like Laya, but even there it is reportedly becoming an exception. In general the husbands of one wife are brothers. Polyandry is also known among the Brokpa people of Merak and Sakten in eastern Trashigang. A well-known example of a person in a polygamous marriage in Bhutan is the 4th King Jigme Singye Wangchuck, who is married to four sisters.
