= Drone-Enhanced Emergency Medical Services =

Use case for autonomous drones

Drone Emergency Medical Services (DEMS) involves the use of highly autonomous Beyond Visual Line of Sight (BVLOS) drones to deliver critical medical supplies, such as Automated External Defibrillators (AEDs), life-saving medications, and remote diagnostic equipment, directly to emergency situations. This innovative approach is gaining traction globally, as it significantly reduces response times, thereby improving patient outcomes in time-sensitive scenarios like cardiac arrests and other emergencies where every second counts.

The evolution of drone technology in EMS has been fueled by advancements in unmanned aerial systems (UAS) and the growing recognition of their capabilities in addressing logistical challenges, particularly in remote or underserved areas. Initial trials in the early 2010s laid the groundwork for delivering medical supplies, while subsequent pilot programs have focused on specialized applications, including rapid delivery of emergency medical equipment and live video feeds to support first responders before their arrival at the scene. Despite the promising benefits of drone-enhanced EMS, some challenges remain, including public acceptance, regulatory hurdles, and the technological complexity of integrating these systems into existing emergency response frameworks. As healthcare organizations seek innovative solutions to improve emergency medical responses, addressing these challenges will be crucial.

== History ==
The concept of using drones in emergency medical services (EMS) has evolved significantly over the past decade, driven by advancements in drone technology and the growing recognition of their potential in healthcare. Initially, drones were primarily used for military operations and recreational activities. However, their versatility has led to a broader range of use cases, including EMS.

=== Early developments ===
The use of drones for healthcare logistics can be traced back to early trials in the 2010s, which focused on delivering medical supplies to remote areas, aiming to address logistical challenges such as extreme weather, natural disasters, and limited transport infrastructure. These early implementations demonstrated the potential for drones to significantly improve medical delivery efficiency, particularly in emergencies where time is critical.

=== Expansion into Emergency medicine ===
As drone technology matured, EMS began to explore more specialized applications. By the mid-2010s, pilot programs were developed to test drones for the delivery of critical medical supplies, such as Automated External Defibrillators (AEDs), particularly for out-of-hospital cardiac arrest cases. These programs often involved collaboration between healthcare providers, technology developers, and regulatory agencies to ensure safety and operational compliance.

=== Future directions ===
Today, drones are increasingly being integrated into EMS, with applications ranging from rapid assessment of emergency situations to delivering medical supplies like AEDs and medical supplies and remote diagnostic equipment. The potential of drone technology continues to expand as regulatory frameworks evolve, and ongoing research promises further innovations in the field.

== Technology ==
The technology behind drone emergency medical services (DEMS) leverages advancements in unmanned aerial systems (UAS), enabling the rapid and autonomous delivery of medical supplies to incident sites before regular units arrive on scene. These drones operate Beyond Visual Line of Sight (BVLOS), allowing them to respond faster, cover greater distances, often equipped with advanced navigation systems, sensors, and real-time data transmission capabilities.

=== Adaptations for medical deliveries ===
The drones used in DEMS are often modified to meet healthcare-specific requirements. Delivery solutions are designed to carry a flexible payload adaptable to local conditions and needs. These adaptations ensure that sensitive medical materials can be delivered safely and effectively in an emergency.

=== Operational challenges ===
Despite their effectiveness, drones face several operational challenges. Factors such as weather conditions, battery life, and payload capacity can limit the performance of drones in emergency medical applications. However, ongoing advancements in drone technology aim to overcome these limitations. Some of these innovations include more efficient batteries, better obstacle detection systems, and improved communication networks that allow for more reliable operation in adverse conditions.

=== Real-time data transmission ===
In addition to delivering physical medical supplies, drones used in DEMS are often equipped with high-definition cameras and sensors, providing live video feeds and biometric data to emergency responders. This allows healthcare professionals to assess the situation remotely and guide on-site interventions before physical responders arrive.

== Applications ==
=== Medical supply deliveries ===
Drones are being used in the rapid transportation of medical supplies in emergencies. For example, healthcare drones have been adapted to carry critical items such as defibrillators (AEDs), pharmaceuticals, anti bleeding equipment and remote diagnostic equipment which can make a significant difference in emergency response scenarios.

=== Emergency response and disaster relief ===
In emergency medical situations, such as out-of-hospital cardiac arrests, drones have been deployed to deliver AEDs quickly to the scene. Studies show that AED-equipped drones can reduce response times compared to traditional ground transportation. This reduction in time is crucial for improving patient outcomes, particularly in cardiac arrest cases where immediate defibrillation can save lives.

Drones have also been used in disaster relief, where they can rapidly deliver medical supplies to hard-to-reach areas following natural disasters or large-scale emergencies. These drones can fly over blocked roads and other obstacles, ensuring that medical help reaches those in need as quickly as possible.

=== Remote patient monitoring and telemedicine ===
Drones are also being used to support telemedicine and remote patient monitoring. By transmitting real-time video feeds and biometric data from delivered devices, enables healthcare professionals to assess patients' conditions remotely and provide real-time consultation and diagnosis. This is particularly useful in areas with limited healthcare resources, allowing for more timely interventions and support.

== AED-drone trials ==
Several trials have evaluated the effectiveness of drones delivering AEDs in real-life cardiac arrest situations. A Swedish study in 2020-2023 reported that drones arrived before ambulances in 57% of cases, and AEDs were attached by bystanders in 35% of these cases. These drones achieved a 92% success rate in delivering AEDs within 9 meters of the target. The real-life case study published in the New England Journal of Medicine showed that a drone-delivered AED was successfully used to defibrillate a cardiac arrest patient before emergency medical services arrived.

== See also ==
- Unmanned Aerial Vehicle
- Emergency Medical Services
