= Tshering Wangyel =

Bhutanese film director

Tshering Wangyel (1971 or 1972 – 7 December 2015) was a Bhutanese film director. He directed more than 50 films and died of pneumonia while making his last film.

In 1999, he released the first movie in Dzongkha language, Rewaa (Hope), a love story where two college boy fall for the same girl. As one critic put it, "the commercial Bhutanese film industry was born." In 2007, he produced Bakchha, the first Bhutanese horror movie.
