= Like a Son =

- French: Comme un fils
- Directed by: Nicolas Boukhrief
- Written by: Nicolas Boukhrief
- Produced by: Richard Grandpierre
- Starring: Vincent Lindon; Karole Rocher; Stefan Virgil Stoica
- Cinematography: Lydia Boukhrief
- Edited by: Albertine Lastera
- Production company: Eskwad
- Distributed by: Le Pacte
- Release date: 6 March 2024 (France)
- Running time: 102 minutes
- Country: France
- Language: French

Like a Son is a 2024 French drama film about a teacher who takes a juvenile delinquent under his wing. The boy was raised in the Romani community.

== Cast ==
- Vincent Lindon as Jacques Romand
- Karole Rocher as Harmel Kirshner
- Stefan Virgil Stoica as Victor
- Sorin Mihai as Andreas
- Florin Opasche as Dolofan
- Robert Opasche as Raul
- Guillaume Draux as Dr. Ambert
- Saïd Aïssaoui as Commissioner Mauri
