= I, the Song =

2024 film by Dechen Roder

- Promotional release poster
- Dzongkha: མོ་གི་གསང་བའི་ཞབས་ཁྲ
- Directed by: Dechen Roder
- Written by: Dechen Roder
- Produced by: Dechen Roder; Johann Chapelan
- Starring: Tandin Bidha; Jimmy Wangyal Tshering; Tshering Dorji; Sonam Lhamo; Dorji Wangdi
- Cinematography: Rangoli Agarwal
- Edited by: Noémie Loeve; Dechen Roder
- Music by: Tashi Dorji
- Production companies: Dakinny Productions; Girelle Productions; Fidalgo Films; Volos Films
- Distributed by: Diversion
- Release date: 19 November 2024 (PÖFF)
- Running time: 113 minutes
- Countries: Bhutan; Norway; Italy; France
- Language: Dzongkha

I, the Song (Dzongkha: མོ་གི་གསང་བའི་ཞབས་ཁྲ, romanized: mo gi gsang b'i zhabs khra) is a 2024 drama film written, co-produced and directed by Dechen Roder. It follows a school teacher, who travels to the south of Bhutan in search of a look-alike to save her job and reputation.

The film had its world premiere at the Critics' Picks section of the Tallinn Black Nights Film Festival on 19 November 2024, where it won the Best Director award for Dechen Roder. In February 2025, the film won eight awards at the Bhutan National Film Awards, including Best Film, Best Original Score, Best Director, Best Screenplay and Best Editor, among others.

It was also selected as the Bhutanese entry for the Best International Feature Film at the 98th Academy Awards, but it was not nominated.

== Cast ==
- Tandin Bidha as Nima
- Jimmy Wangyal Tshering as Tandin
- Tshering Dorji
- Sonam Lhamo
- Dorji Wangdi

== Production ==
The film is produced and directed by Dechen Roder for Dakinny Productions and Johann Chapelan for Girelle Production, in collaboration with a diverse group of international co-producers from Norway, Taiwan, Italy, and France. Bhutan’s first streaming platform, Samuh, joins as the local co-producer. The project has garnered significant international support, receiving grants from Visions Sud Est, the MPA APSA Film Fund, Sorfond, WCF Europe, CNC ACM, Ciclic, and Mibac.

== Release ==
I, the Song had its premiere in the 'First Feature Competition' at the Tallinn Black Nights Film Festival on 19 November 2024. It had its Asian Premiere at the 55th International Film Festival of India on 27 November in the competition.

On 19 January 2025, it was screened at the 10th Ajanta-Ellora International Film Festival, India. It also competed in Feature films in competition at the Vesoul International Film Festival of Asian Cinema and was screened on 16 February 2025. It was also showcased in the New Southbound Vision at Taipei Film Festival on 21 June 2025.

It was selected at the 24th New York Asian Film Festival and had its New York premiere on 14 July 2025, and on 19 July it was screened at the New Horizons Film Festival in Waves section.

On November 2, it was screened at the Hong Kong Asian Film Festival in the Wide Angle section. It was presented in the Asian Perspectives section of the 20th Jogja-NETPAC Asian Film Festival on 2 December 2025.

== Reception ==
Debanjan Dhar, reviewing I, the Song for High on Films at the Tallinn Black Nights Film Festival, awarded the film 3.5 out of 5 stars, describing it as "steeped in an almost metaphysical spirit of mystery" and calling it "an alluring achievement."

== Accolades ==
Award	Ceremony date	Category	Recipient(s)	Result	Ref.
Tallinn Black Nights Film Festival	24 November 2024	Critics' Picks Competition: Best Director	Dechen Roder	Won	

== See also ==
- List of submissions to the 98th Academy Awards for Best International Feature Film
- List of Bhutanese submissions for the Academy Award for Best International Feature Film
