= The Monk and the Gun =

2023 film by Pawo Choyning Dorji

- Theatrical release poster
- Directed by: Pawo Choyning Dorji
- Written by: Pawo Choyning Dorji
- Produced by: Pawo Choyning Dorji; Feng Hsu; Stephanie Lai; Jean-Christophe Simon; Janee Pennington
- Starring: Tandin Wangchuk; Deki Lhamo; Pema Zangmo Sherpa; Tandin Sonam; Harry Einhorn; Choeying Jatsho; Tandin Phubz; Yuphel Lhendup Selden; Kelsang Choejay
- Cinematography: Jigme Tenzing
- Edited by: Hsiao Yun-Ku
- Music by: Frederic Alvarez
- Production companies: Films Boutique; Dangphu Dingphu: A 3 Pigs Production; Journey to the East Films; Tomson Films; Closer Media; N8; Wooden Trailer Productions
- Distributed by: Films Boutique (worldwide); Impact Films (Indian subcontinent); Pyramide Distribution (France); Roadside Attractions (North America); Swallow Wings Films (Taiwan); Edko Films (Hong Kong)
- Release dates: September 1, 2023 (Telluride); October 17, 2023 (Bhutan); February 9, 2024 (United States); June 26, 2024 (France)
- Running time: 107 minutes
- Countries: Bhutan; Taiwan; France; United States; Hong Kong
- Languages: English; Dzongkha
- Box office: $1.5 million

The Monk and the Gun is a 2023 drama film directed, written and co-produced by Pawo Choyning Dorji, and starring Tandin Wangchuk, Deki Lhamo, Pema Zangmo Sherpa, Tandin Sonam, Harry Einhorn, Choeying Jatsho, Tandin Phubz, Yuphel Lhendup Selden and Kelsang Choejay. It is an international co-production between Bhutan, Taiwan, France, the United States, and Hong Kong.

The Monk and the Gun premiered at the 50th Telluride Film Festival on 1 September 2023. It was selected as the Bhutanese entry for the Best International Feature Film at the 96th Academy Awards, and was one of the 15 finalist films in the December shortlist. The film was theatrically released in North America on 2 February 2024, and is scheduled to be released in France on 26 June 2024.

== Plot ==
In 2006, as Bhutan prepares to hold its first democratic election, the Bhutanese government stages a mock election as a training exercise. In the town of Ura, an old lama instructs young monk Tashi to procure some firearms by way of preparation for the impending upheaval. Meanwhile, American gun collector Ron Coleman arrives in the country seeking to acquire an antique rifle. He is driven to Ura by hired guide Benji, where he meets with an elderly man who has the rifle, and agrees to sell it to him. However, when he goes to withdraw cash from a bank for the purchase, Tashi arrives, and the monk gives Tashi the gun as a gift.

When Ron and Benji learn of this, they pursue Tashi and try to convince him to sell them the gun, but he is unwilling to do so. He eventually agrees to trade it in exchange for two AK-47s that Ron arranges to have smuggled into the country from India. Meanwhile, police, informed of Ron's interest in guns, seek him out for questioning.

Separately, married couple Tshomo and Choephel come into conflict over Choephel's devotion to one candidate in the election, which has soured his relationship with Tshomo's mother and drawn his attention away from his daughter Yuphel's need for an eraser. She is given one by the official hosting the mock election, who tries with limited success to convince the townspeople of the importance of democratization.

Ron and Benji return to Ura, but by the time they arrive, the lama has begun a ceremony to celebrate the beginning of construction of a new stupa using the antique gun. It is revealed that the lama sought it as a symbol of evil to bury in the foundation of the stupa, which he does. The police also arrive and try to detain Ron. However, Benji tells them that Ron brought the AK-47s to donate to the ceremony, a story Tashi endorses. The lama gives him a large phallus as thanks.

== Cast ==
- Harry Einhorn as Ron Coleman
- Tandin Wangchuk as Tashi
- Deki Lhamo as Tshomo
- Pema Zangmo Sherpa as Tshering Yangden
- Tandin Sonam as Benji
- Choeying Jatsho as Choephel
- Tandin Phubz as Phurba
- Yuphel Lhendup Selden
- Kelsang Choejay

== Release ==
The Monk and the Gun had its world premiere on September 1, 2023, at the 50th Telluride Film Festival, and then screened on September 9 in the Centerpiece section of the 48th Toronto International Film Festival. It was also invited at the 28th Busan International Film Festival in the 'A Window on Asian Cinema' section and at the 18th Rome Film Festival, where it was screened in October 2023.

In October 2023, Roadside Attractions acquired the North American distribution rights to the film. The film's North American release was on February 2, 2024.

The film was released on 2 May 2024 in Italy (where it grossed $315 thousand, as of 3 June 2024). It was released in France and Belgium on 26 June 2024; in Germany on 1 August and in Spain on 9 August 2024.

== Reception ==
=== Critical response ===
On the review aggregator website Rotten Tomatoes, 94% of 48 critics' reviews are positive, with an average rating of 8/10. The website's consensus reads: "Surrounding its poignant insights with a gentle layer of crowd-pleasing comedy, The Monk and the Gun is a timely political satire that underscores the fragility of democracy." Metacritic, which uses a weighted average, assigned the film a score of 74 out of 100, based on 13 critics, indicating "generally favorable" reviews.

Deadline Hollywood's chief film critic Pete Hammond called it one of the best films in the 50th Telluride Film Festival, writing that there was "no sophomore jinx here, this one is even better than Pawo Choyning Dorji's first, and that is saying something", and that the director "presents a gentle satirical jab at American democracy, but shows the difficulties of changing a society whose pure and lovely innocence stands in the way of a political revolution, even as they are also just discovering James Bond and The Spice Girls".

Alex Billington of the First Showing described the film as "a fascinating philosophical look at life in Bhutan, which was told with confidence and filmed absolutely perfectly", hailing it as "a brilliant satirical commentary on America's stubborn ways, as opposed to the more sensible Bhutan society based in Buddhism. Not only is watching The Monk and the Gun such a pleasant and uplifting experience, it's the kind of film that will leave you profoundly affected by the story." Billington further added that the film was "one-of-a-kind", and that it " [provided] a profoundly distinct perspective on Buddhist philosophy and Himalayan culture that many are entirely unfamiliar with and can't quite make sense of".

Reviewing the film for The Hollywood Reporter, Stephen Farber praised performances of the entire cast, the film's humour and its fast-paced narrative, whilst criticising the plot's excessively contrived development.

=== Accolades ===
The Monk and the Gun won the Showcase Audience Choice Award for the 2023 Vancouver International Film Festival.

The film was awarded the Special Jury Prize at the 2023 Rome Film Festival.

== See also ==
- List of submissions to the 96th Academy Awards for Best International Feature Film
- List of Bhutanese submissions for the Academy Award for Best International Feature Film
