= Yeshey Dem =

Bhutanese politician

Member of the National Assembly of Bhutan
- Incumbent
- Assumed office 31 October 2018
- Preceded by: Pema Drukpa
- Constituency: Khamaed Lunana

Personal details
- Born: c. 1993
- Party: Druk Nyamrup Tshogpa (DNT)

Yeshey Dem (Dzongkha: ཡེ་ཤེས་ སྒྲོལམ།) is a Bhutanese politician who has been a member of the National Assembly of Bhutan since October 2018.

== Education ==
She holds a Bachelor of Arts degree in Language and Literature from the Institute of Language and Cultural Studies, Bhutan.

== Political career ==
Before joining politics, Dem worked as a public relations assistant.

She was elected to the National Assembly of Bhutan as a candidate of DNT from Khamaed Lunana constituency in 2018 Bhutanese National Assembly election. She received 419 votes and defeated Dhendup, a candidate of Druk Phuensum Tshogpa.
