= Lake Dem =

Lake in northern Burkina Faso

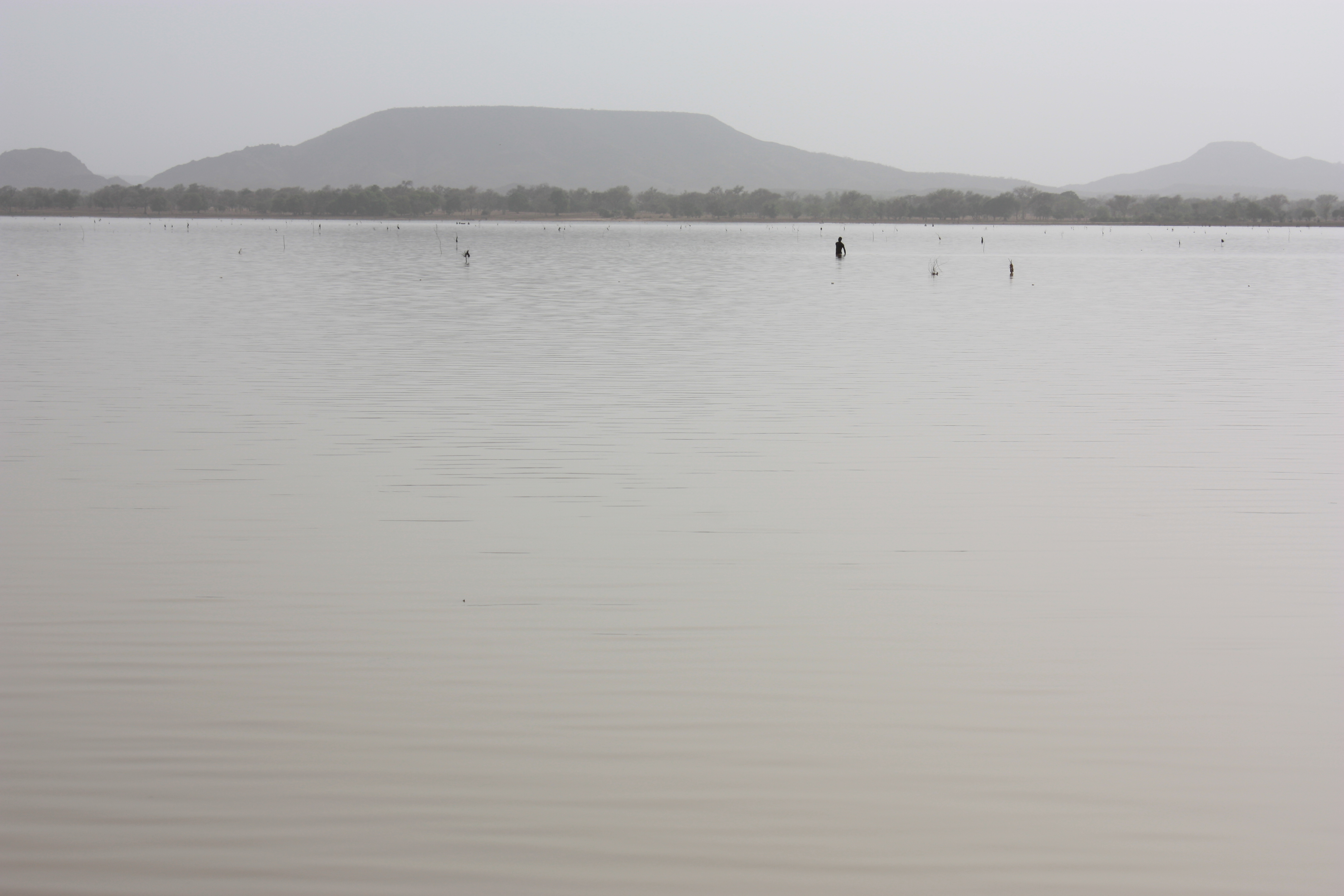
- Lake Dem, seen from the eastern shore

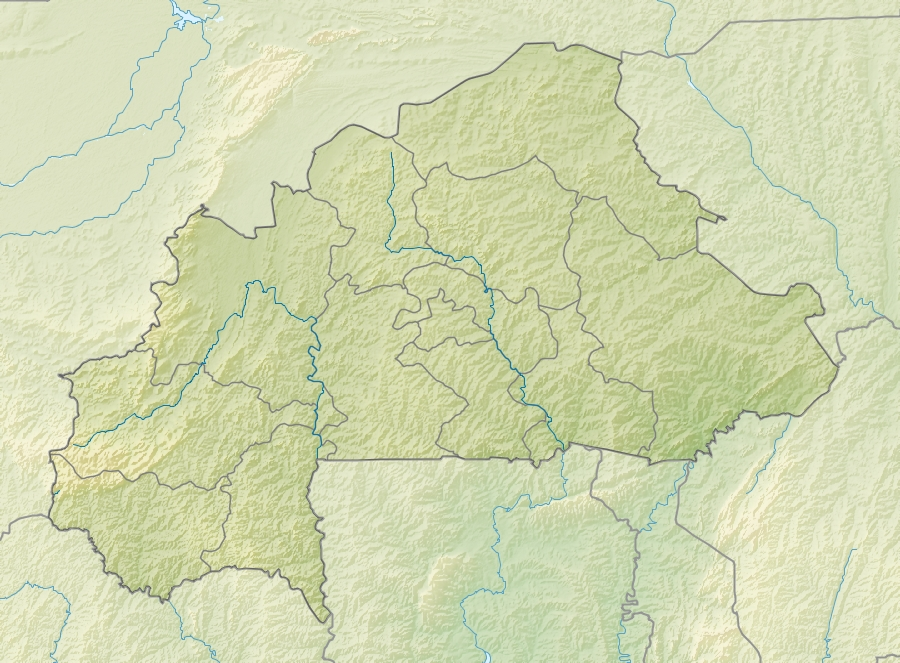
- Location within Burkina Faso
- Location: Burkina Faso
- Coordinates: 13°11′43″N 1°09′02″W
- Primary outflows: White Volta
- Basin countries: Burkina Faso
- Max. length: 5 km (3.1 mi)
- Max. width: 2 km (1.2 mi)
- Surface elevation: 304 m (997 ft)

Ramsar Wetland
- Official name: Lac Dem
- Designated: 7 October 2009
- Reference no.: 1882

Lake Dem is a small lake in northern Burkina Faso, located to the north of Kaya, south of the Sahel Reserve and south-east of Lake Bam. It drains into the White Volta. It is 5 km long and 2 km wide. It lies at an elevation of 304 m (997 feet). The lake has been designated as a Ramsar site since 2009.
