= Bakchha =

Bakchha is a 2007 film by Tshering Wangyel. It is the first horror film produced in Bhutan, where most movies are musicals that portray an imagined perfect society. Most of the actors in the film are not professional actors but are hired locally; Rinzin Choden, one of the leading actresses, is one of the few professional actors in the film.
