= Dawa Dem =

Bhutanese bureaucrat

Dasho Dawa Dem
- ཟླ་བ་སྒྲོལམོ

Private Secretary, Royal Secretariat
- In office 1 June 1965 – October 1967
- Monarch: Jigme Dorji Wangchuck

Ramjam, Thimphu District Administration
- In office October 1967 – July 1971

Protocol Officer, Ministry of Foreign Affairs
- In office July 1971 – 1973
- Monarchs: Jigme Dorji Wangchuck; Jigme Singye Wangchuck

Councillor, Royal Advisory Council
- In office 1973–1985
- Monarch: Jigme Singye Wangchuck

Secretary, National Women's Association of Bhutan
- In office 23 February 1985 – 2009

Personal details
- Born: 16 May 1944; Haa, Bhutan
- Died: 15 February 2018 (aged 73); Thimphu, Bhutan

Dasho Dawa Dem (Dzongkha: ཟླ་བ་སྒྲོལམོ; 16 May 1944 – 15 February 2018) was a Bhutanese bureaucrat. The first woman to join the Bhutanese civil service, she held positions in various government branches, namely the Royal Secretariat, the Thimphu District Administration, the Ministry of Foreign Affairs, and the Royal Advisory Council, in a career spanning two decades, from 1965 to 1985. She helped establish the National Women's Association of Bhutan in 1981, and was appointed its secretary in 1985. She retired in 2009 and died in 2018.

== Early life ==
Dasho Dawa Dem was born on 16 May 1944, in Takchu Goenpa in Haa District. In Haa, she was one of the first Bhutanese to receive a modern education with her attending school there from 1956 to 1963. She studied further in various Indian schools under a Bhutanese Government scholarship.

== Government service ==
Dawa Dem began her career at the Royal Secretariat in Bhutan on 1 June 1965, as a private secretary. In October 1967, she was promoted to Ramjam (assistant district magistrate/chief executive) in the Thimphu District administration, where she worked till July 1971. In 1971 she was transferred to the newly established Ministry of Foreign Affairs, where she worked as a protocol officer till 1973. She was then promoted to councillor in the now-defunct Royal Advisory Council, a post she held till 1985.

Dawa Dem was the first woman Ramjam in Bhutan. On her appointment as Ramjam in 1967, she was conferred the honorific title Dasho in Thimphu by the Third Druk Gyalpo of Bhutan, Jigme Dorji Wangchuck. Besides being the first woman Ramjam, she was also the first woman to join the Bhutanese civil service and to become Royal Advisory Councillor. She remains one of the few women to have received the title Dasho.

== Other activities ==
While Ramjam, Dawa Dem attended a diploma course in spoken English in Australia in 1971. Later, she attended a course in National Government Administration at the Institute of Public Administration in Japan in 1973.

Dawa Dem helped establish the National Women's Association of Bhutan (NWAB) in 1981. She was appointed its secretary on 23 February 1985, after her tenure as Royal Advisory Councillor. The NWAB is the premier women's association in Bhutan. She retired from NWAB headship in 2009.

Dawa Dem attended the 1985 UN Women's Decade Conference and the 1995 Fourth World Conference on Women.

== Death ==
Dawa Dem died aged 73 on 15 February 2018, at the Jigme Dorji Wangchuck National Referral Hospital in Thimphu. She was cremated on 26 February. The Privy Council of Bhutan, in a press release, stated

She will be cherished and remembered by [the] Bhutanese for her selfless dedication and service to the country.
