= Lunana: A Yak in the Classroom =

2019 film

- International release poster
- Directed by: Pawo Choyning Dorji
- Written by: Pawo Choyning Dorji
- Produced by: Pawo Choyning Dorji; Jia Honglin; Stephanie Lai; Steven Xiang
- Starring: Sherab Dorji; Ugyen Norbu Lhendup; Kelden Lhamo Gurung; Kunzang Wangdi
- Cinematography: Jigme Tenzing
- Edited by: Hsiao-Yun Ku
- Production company: Dangphu Dingphu:a 3 pigs Production
- Distributed by: Films Boutique
- Release date: 5 October 2019 (London)
- Running time: 109 minutes
- Country: Bhutan
- Language: Dzongkha

Lunana: A Yak in the Classroom (Dzongkha: ལུང་ནག་ན, romanized: lung nag na) is a 2019 Bhutanese drama film directed by Pawo Choyning Dorji in his feature directorial debut. The film had its world premiere at the BFI London Film Festival. It was a nominee for Best International Feature Film at the 94th Academy Awards.

== Plot ==
Ugyen lives in Thimphu with his grandmother. He has completed four of his five mandatory years of training as a government teacher. However, he does not enjoy teaching and dreams of moving to Australia to become a singer. When he is assigned to teach in the remote mountain village of Lunana, he considers quitting his job, but his grandmother urges him to complete his teaching assignment. He decides to take it and leaves the city.

Ugyen meets Michen, a village guide who leads him up the six-day-long path to Lunana, a village with a population of 56 people, 4800 meters above sea level. The villagers are excited by his arrival, but Ugyen, appalled by the poor conditions of the village, expresses his regret at coming and asks to be taken back. Asha, the village leader, informs him that the mules need time to rest and he can take Ugyen back in a few days. The next morning, Ugyen is awoken by Pem Zam, the class captain, who tells him the children are waiting for him in the classroom. Ugyen is taken aback by their affection for him, as the children believe teachers have the ability to “touch the future”. He decides to stay and teach for the remainder of the year.

Ugyen returns the next day better prepared to teach and improvises a solution to the lack of a blackboard by writing directly on the wall with charcoal. Michen later constructs a makeshift blackboard for him. Ugyen slowly makes improvements to the classroom, including sacrificing the paper covering his windows when the children quickly run out of scarce writing material. Asha suggests that the teacher may have been a yak in a past life, as yaks are prized in the community. Ugyen quickly becomes a favorite of the children, performing songs on his guitar and teaching them maths, English, and Dzongkha. They are sad when they learn that Ugyen plans to leave when winter comes and will not return.

Ugyen later meets Saldon, the niece of Asha, as she sings a local song atop a hillside. She tells him that she sings it daily as an offering to the mountain spirits, and he asks her to teach it to him. They meet daily, and he slowly learns how to sing it himself. She says it is called Yak Lebi Lhadar, and it was written by a local yak herder who lamented having to slaughter his favorite yak for the good of the village; the last verse is sung from the perspective of the yak, promising to return to its owner one day. Saldon later gifts Ugyen a yak, Norbu, so that he can use its dung to start fires. Because of the cold, Ugyen must keep Norbu in the classroom, and it becomes a fixture of the lessons.

Asha approaches Ugyen with news that winter is approaching and it is time for him to leave before the pass is covered in snow. He asks Ugyen to come back the following spring, but Ugyen says that he intends to leave Bhutan for good, disappointing him. He breaks the news to Saldon, reassuring her that a better teacher will come in the spring, but Saldon says that only the children can be the judges of that and they all love Ugyen. She hopes he will come back someday and perform Yak Lebi Lhadar for her.

Ugyen leaves Lunana after a heartfelt goodbye from the villagers. Pem Zam gives him a letter from all the children, and Saldon gifts him a white scarf. Asha sings Yak Lebi Lhadar as he departs, and Michen informs Ugyen that Asha originally wrote the song, but has not sung since his wife's death some years earlier. Ugyen later reads the letter from the children, in which they thank him, call him their favorite teacher, and urge him to return in the spring. On the way down the mountain, Ugyen stops at a shrine and leaves an offering for safe passage, saying that he hopes to return.

The end of the film shows Ugyen singing a Western song in a bar in Australia, where nobody is paying attention. Annoyed, he stops performing this song, the barkeeper complains that Ugyen is being paid to sing, the audience goes quiet and Ugyen begins to sing Yak Lebi Lhadar leading into the closing credits.

== Cast ==
- Sherab Dorji as Ugyen Dorji
- Ugyen Norbu Lhendup as Michen
- Kelden Lhamo Gurung as Saldon
- Kunzang Wangdi as Asha Jinpa
- Tshering Dorji as Singye
- Sonam Tashi as Tandin
- Pem Zam as Pem Zam
- Tsheri Zom as Ugyen's grandmother

== Production ==
An article in NPR states:

Pawo Choyning Dorji, ... spent a year and a half preparing for filming, hauling in all of the necessary equipment and overseeing the construction of housing for his crew. He used the time to get to know the cast of locals he hired to play themselves, and slipped details of their lives into the script.

"They'd never set foot in a cinema or seen a movie," [Dorji] says. "They acted naturally, as they were, and it worked out in a beautiful way."

The weather conditions are harsh, and it is always raining or snowing. There's only a two-month window when the sun shines — in September and October. Even though September and October are considered pleasant months, it was still very cold.

The production was made carbon negative, by the use of solar panels and batteries.

The article also quotes Dorji as saying:

It's ironic though. Until the last day of filming, I was wracked by worry over whether I was doing the right thing by intruding into the villagers' lives. When I left Lunana, the village was being modernized. The government was laying roads and erecting telephone poles. The villagers were happy. Their standard of living was bound to improve. People would be more connected. But I knew life was going to change irrevocably and my footage of Lunana would be the last time we could see it so untouched. Pem Zam, one of the little girls from the village, for instance is now on Facebook and TikTok — and she sends me videos of her dancing!

== Critical response ==
On the review aggregator website Rotten Tomatoes, 98% of 63 critics' reviews are positive, with an average rating of 7.6/10. The website's consensus reads: "Lunana: A Yak in the Classroom is a simple story with a big heart -- and a reminder of film's ability to communicate universal truths across international borders." Metacritic, which uses a weighted average, assigned the film a score of 76 out of 100, based on 13 critics, indicating "generally favorable" reviews.

An article in The Guardian calls it a “heart and feet-warming tale of a Bhutan village”, and says:

It is, perhaps, a movie machine-tooled for audiences outside Bhutan and despite early talk of the children being educated for a life beyond what they would traditionally expect, we don’t get that much discussion of how things might change for them or for the village. Yet there is something winning in this calm, walking-pace drama – and the landscape is amazing.

The BFI calls it a "a gentle Bhutanese drama" and a “charming, quietly funny culture-clash film [that] is a thoughtful exploration of happiness and community values.” and a "fish-out-of-water tale, culturally specific but universal enough to become Bhutan’s first-ever Oscar contender" and "quietly majestic".

== Awards and nominations ==
The film won the Audience Choice Award for Best Feature Film and the Best of the Fest at the 2020 Palm Springs International Film Festival. At the 26th Film Festival della Lessinia in Italy, the film was awarded the Lessinia d'Oro Award for Best Film of the festival, the Giuria Microcosmo del carcere di Verona Award and a Special Mention in the Log to Green Award. At the Festival international du film de Saint-Jean-de-Luz, in Saint-Jean-de-Luz, France, the film won the Prix du Public, and Sherab Dorji was awarded the Best Actor award for his role of Ugyen Dorji.

It was selected as the Bhutanese entry for the Best International Feature Film at the 93rd Academy Awards, but it was later disqualified. However, it was resubmitted as Bhutan's entry for the following year, and was shortlisted in December 2021, as one of the five films competing at the 94th Academy Awards, making it Bhutan's first Oscar-nominated film.

== See also ==
- List of submissions to the 93rd Academy Awards for Best International Feature Film
- List of submissions to the 94th Academy Awards for Best International Feature Film
- List of Bhutanese submissions for the Academy Award for Best International Feature Film
