= Ap Bokto =

- Theatrical poster
- Directed by: Karma Dhendup
- Produced by: Karma Dhendup
- Edited by: Sonam Wangdi
- Production company: Athang Animation Studio
- Release date: September 2014
- Running time: 53 minutes
- Country: Bhutan
- Language: Dzongkha

Ap Bokto is a 2014 Bhutanese animated film produced and directed by Karma Dhendup under Athang Animation Studio.

It is the first computer animated film in Bhutan and the first animated film to be based on a Bhutanese folk tale. The plot revolves around Ap Bokto who encounters and outwits several wild animals whose goal is to make him as their meal.

== Production ==
Production for the film took more than 2 years with a budget of Nu. 4.5 million. The production team was composed of 30 people. Athang Animation Studio's proprietor, Karma Dhendup, directed and produced the film. The film's duration is 53 minutes. Karma Dhendup was inspired to create Ap Bokto as a means to connect children with traditional Bhutanese values and stories. He aimed to address the challenges of a rapidly changing world by equipping the younger generation with the right values through storytelling.

== Cast ==
- Phurba Thinley as Ap Bokto
- Aum Zam as Aum Buthri
- Angay Zam as Grandmother
- Jamyang as Ap Bokto's son
- Tshering Choden as Ap Bokto's daughter

== Release ==
The film was first released in Thimphu in September 2014. The film was scheduled to be screened in other districts in the country but future screenings were halted following reports of the film being leaked.

== Reception ==
Although the film was aimed at targeting kids above five years of age, it overwhelmingly poured in viewers as young as one-and-a-half-year-old babies. Internet traffic Analytics showed there were more than five thousand viewers of Ap Bokto every day on YouTube and traffic showed 30% of the viewers were from outside Bhutan and almost every country on earth has viewed this channel.

YouTuber PewDiePie reacted to the film's trailer in a 2016 video, dancing to its theme song.

The film was positively received by the Bhutanese audience, especially by children. By around March 2015, the film, including the relevant comics, had made money amounting to around 40 percent of the Nu. 4.5 million budget. Karma Dhendup has received invitations from European film festivals due to the film's success.

== Synopsis ==
Ap Bokto sequel is yet to be released and the synopsis differs but is all in line with its original shapes.

=== Leakage ===
Dhendup's animation studio was approached by a woman who found a flash drive from a customer containing the film for theatrical release on February 6, 2015. Dhendup believes that the film could have been leaked as early as the end of January 2015. Dhendup said that he heard copies of the film reached India.

=== Purpose and objective making Ap Bokto ===
As we live in a rapidly changing world it becomes crucial to equip our children with the right values and help them navigate the challenges they encounter in life through stories. Ap Bokto's films are made to connect the characters' past, scenes, and style from ancient times.

Animating also helps transcribe and preserve stories that are to be lost as in most countries oral traditions (folktales) are diminishing.

It also allows showcasing the beautiful culture and tradition of the Himalayas.

== Theme Song ==
AP BOKTO theme song by Ugyen Tshering. The lyrics were written by Ugyen Norbu, Ugyen Pandey, and Sonam Rinzin. Ap Bokto theme song was sung by Ugyen Pandey
