= Pawo Choyning Dorji =

Bhutanese filmmaker

- དཔའ་བོ་ཆོས་དབྱིངས་རྡོ་རྗི།
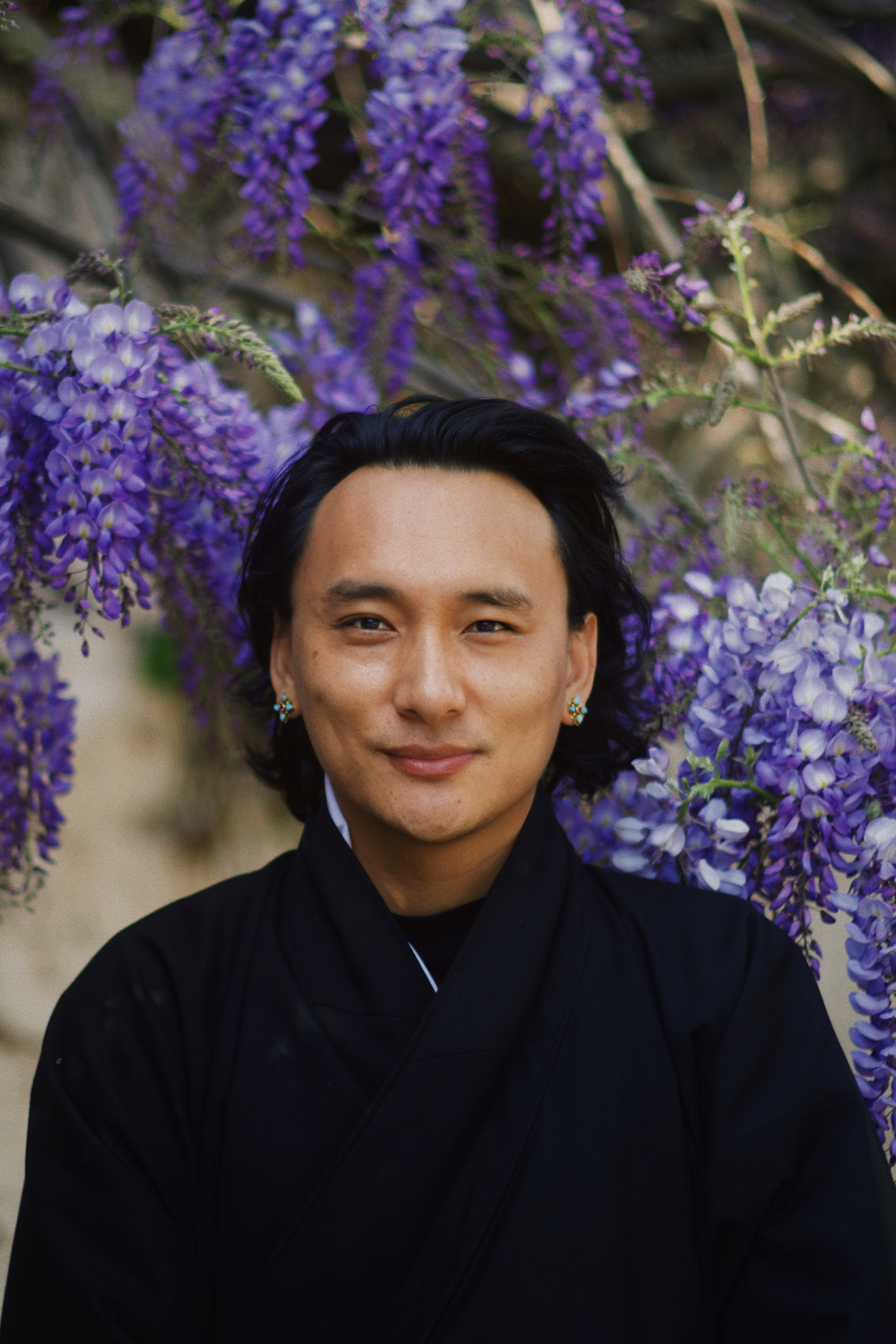
- Born: 23 June 1983 (age 43); Thimphu, Bhutan
- Education: Lawrence University
- Occupations: Filmmaker, Screenwriter, Producer, Photographer
- Notable work: Lunana: A Yak in the Classroom, The Monk and the Gun
- Spouse: Stephanie Lai (m. 2009)
- Children: 2
- Relatives: Stan Lai (father-in-law)
- Awards: Nominee for Best International Feature for 94th Academy Awards; Druk Thuksey; Norwegian Peace Film Award Tromsø International Film Festival; Premio Lessinia D'Oro Award Lessinia Film Festival; Premio Della Giuria Microcosmo Award; NETPAC Award; Special Jury Award Rome Film Festival; IMDb Audience Choice Award Jio Mami Film Festival; Audience Award for Best Narrative Feature Film Palm Springs International Film Festival; Audience Award Fribourg International Film Festival

Pawo Choyning Dorji Druk Thuksey (Dzongkha: དཔའ་བོ་ཆོས་དབྱིངས་རྡོ་རྗི།; born 23 June 1983) is a Bhutanese filmmaker and photographer. His feature directorial debut Lunana: A Yak in the Classroom (2019) was nominated for Best International Feature Film at the 94th Academy Awards. His second film The Monk and the Gun (2023) was shortlisted for the Best International Feature Film for the 96th Academy Awards.

Dorji is the youngest recipient of Bhutan's highest civilian award, the Druk Thuksey, the Heart Son of the Thunder Dragon. It was bestowed to him by King Jigme Khesar Namgyel Wangchuck. He is a member of the Academy of Motion Picture Arts and Sciences. In June, 2024, Dorji received an Honorary Doctorate in the Fine Arts from his Alma Mater Lawrence University, and was the commencement speaker for the graduating class.

== Early life and education ==
The son of a diplomat, Dorji grew up in Bhutan, India, Switzerland, Kuwait and the United States. He attended Kodaikanal International School during his time in India and Yangchenphug Higher Secondary School back in Bhutan. He graduated with a degree in government from Lawrence University in the United States in 2006. He then completed a qualification in Buddhist philosophy at the Sarah Buddhist Institute in 2009.

== Career ==
As a photographer, Dorji has contributed to publications such as VICE, Esquire, and Life. He has authored a number of photography essay books. His third book Light of the Moon was shot over the course of five years.

Dorji, a devout Buddhist, is a student of renowned Buddhist master and filmmaker Khyentse Norbu and discovered filmmaking through working with him, first as director's assistant on Vara: A Blessing (2013) and then as producer of Hema Hema (2016).

Dorji filmed his feature directorial debut over the course of two months at a remote school in the Himalayan village of Lunana. Lunana: A Yak in the Classroom had its world premiere at the 63rd BFI London Film Festival. The film won Audience Choice and Best of the Fest award at the 2020 Palm Springs International Film Festival. It was initially intended to be Bhutan's second submission for Best International Feature at the 93rd Academy Awards, but due to an error was resubmitted the following year, becoming Bhutan's first Oscar nomination. Dorji responded saying "The most magical part of this is it was so unexpected... I hope it inspires Bhutanese and Himalayan filmmakers." This was only Bhutan's second overall submission in the history of the Oscars. The Cup, the directorial debut of Dorji's teacher, Khyentse Norbu, was the first Bhutanese submission, in 1999.

Dorji was invited to become a member of the Academy of Motion Picture Arts and Sciences, having been invited to join the academy as part of both the Directors and Writers branch. He eventually joined the Academy as part of the Directors branch.

On 17 December 2022, on the 115th National Day of Bhutan, Dorji was awarded the highest civilian award in Bhutan the Royal Order of Bhutan, the Druk Thuksey, the Heart Son of the Thunder Dragon, by King Jigme Khesar Namgyel Wangchuck. A Royal Order bestowed to recognize distinguished service to the Bhutanese nation and people. Dorji became the youngest recipient in the history of Bhutan and the first Bhutanese film maker to be awarded the Druk Thuksey.

Dorji's second feature film The Monk and the Gun had its world premiere at the 50th Telluride Film Festival. The film had its International Premiere at the 48th Toronto International Film Festival as part of the festival's Centrepiece Programme. Bhutan submitted The Monk and the Gun as Bhutan's official submission for the Best International Feature Film race at the 96th Academy Awards, and it was shortlisted.

In 2026, Dorji collaborated with cellist Yo-Yo Ma on the short documentary A Song for the Snow Lion. The 21-minute film, set in the Himalayas of Bhutan, uses a traditional folktale about the mythical Snow Lion to explore the effects of climate change and melting Himalayan glaciers, and features Ma performing alongside Bhutanese folk singer Kelden Lhamo. The collaboration began after Ma, having seen Dorji's Lunana: A Yak in the Classroom, approached him about working together on a project concerning global warming and the retreat of the Himalayan glaciers. A Song for the Snow Lion premiered at the 53rd Telluride Film Festival in September 2026.

== Personal life ==
Dorji married Taiwanese actress and producer Fan Yuin "Stephanie" Lai, daughter of playwright Stan Lai, in 2009. They have a daughter and a son. The family split their time between Taiwan, Bhutan, and India.

== Bibliography ==
- Seeing Sacred: Lights & Shadows Along the Path
- Turquoise Heart: Bhutanese remembers a Bhutanese (2017)
- The Light of the Moon: The Legacy of Xuanzang of Tang (2019)

== Filmography ==
Year	Title	Director	Writer	Producer	Other	Notes
2013	Vara: A Blessing	Assistant			Stills photographer	
2016	Hema Hema			Yes		
2019	Lunana: A Yak in the Classroom	Yes	Yes	Yes		Feature directorial debut Nominated — 94th Academy Award for Best International Feature Film
2023	The Monk and the Gun	Yes	Yes	Yes		World Premiere at TFF, International Premiere at TIFF and screening at BIFF. Shortlisted- 96th Academy Award for Best International Feature Film
2024	Tales of Taipei (愛情城事)	Yes	Yes			
2026	A Song for the Snow Lion	Yes	Yes	Yes		World Premiere at TFF
2027	The People’s King	Yes	Yes	Yes		

== Honours ==
- Bhutan :
  - Royal Order of Bhutan Medal [Druk Thuksey] (17 December 2022).
