= The Cup (1999 film) =

1999 film

- DVD cover
- Directed by: Khyentse Norbu
- Written by: Khyentse Norbu
- Produced by: Jeremy Thomas; Raymond Steiner; Malcolm Watson
- Starring: Orgyen Tobgyal, Neten Chokling
- Distributed by: Palm Pictures; Fine Line Features (USA)
- Release date: 29 August 1999
- Running time: 93 minutes
- Country: Bhutan
- Languages: Hindi; Tibetan

The Cup (Tibetan: ཕོར་པ། or Phörpa) is a 1999 Bhutanese sports comedy film written and directed by Khyentse Norbu in his feature directorial debut. The plot involves two young football-crazed Tibetan refugee novice monks who desperately try to obtain a television for their remote Himalayan monastery to watch the 1998 FIFA World Cup final.

The Cup was Bhutan's first-ever submission for the Academy Award for Best Foreign Film, but it was not nominated.

== Plot ==
Two young Tibetan refugees arrive at a monastery in exile in India. Its serene atmosphere is disrupted by soccer fever, the chief instigator being a young student, the soccer enthusiast Orgyen. Determined to see the finals of the 1998 World Cup between France and Brazil, he sets out to organize the rental of a TV set for the monastery. The journey is a test of solidarity, resourcefulness, and friendship for the students and monks.

== Production ==
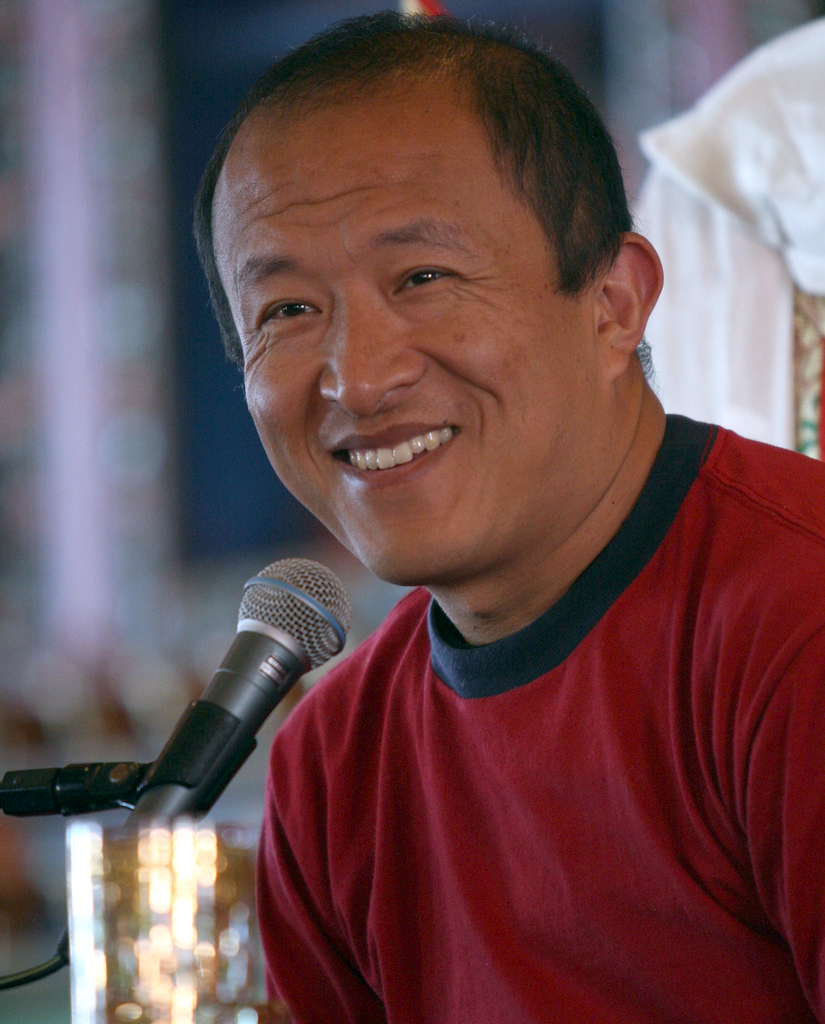
Writer-director Khyentse Norbu in 2006

The Cup was shot in the Tibetan refugee village Bir in India (Himachal Pradesh) (almost entirely between Chokling Gompa and Elu Road).

Producer Jeremy Thomas had developed a relationship with Norbu when he was an advisor on Bertolucci's Little Buddha. Thomas later remembered his experience making the film:

The director Khyentse Norbu is a Tibetan Lama who went to NYC film school, and wanted to make a movie, and I had become friendly with him. There was this charming story, which was a teaching for him but a story for everyone else, about little monks and the World Cup. It was shown in Director’s Fortnight at Cannes, and we brought a lot of Tibetans to the screening, and it was well received and sold all over the world. It was a very happy story for everybody involved.

== Release ==
The Cup was released to DVD on November 13, 2007, in North America by Festival Media (IBFF). The DVD was mastered from a new direct-to-digital transfer from the original film, and includes a bonus documentary entitled Inside The Cup, featuring the director discussing the film, cinema in general and Buddhist philosophy, along with outtakes from the film. There is also a director's commentary audio track.

== Reception ==
Review aggregator Rotten Tomatoes reported a rating of 85% approval.

Tom Dawson from BBC wrote, "an immensely likeable and engaging work, filled with genuine humour, and in which the universal themes - the conflict between ancient traditions and modernization, the value of any human endeavor - emerge naturally from the straightforward storyline."

Roger Ebert that given the movie a three-star rating, commented, "The film has a distinctly Western feel in its timing and character development; it's not an inaccessible exercise in impenetrable mysteries, but a delightful demonstration of how spirituality can coexist quite happily with an intense desire for France to defeat Brazil."

David Parkinson, writing for Empire magazine, gave it 5 out of 5 stars; summarising it as, "Beautifully observed and exquisitely played, this is one to treasure."

== See also ==
- List of association football films
- List of submissions to the 72nd Academy Awards for Best Foreign Language Film
- List of Bhutanese submissions for the Academy Award for Best International Feature Film
