= Dechen Roder =

Bhutanese film director

Dechen Roder (born 1980, Bumthang, Bhutan) is a filmmaker from Bhutan. She started as a music video maker and advertisement maker and then started making her own films. In 2011 she made her first film named Original Photocopy of Happiness which was nominated for Best Short Film at the Brussels International Independent Film Festival 2011, and won “Special Mention” award at the Hong Kong ifva Awards 2012.

She is also the founder and organizer for Beskop Tsechu.

== Films ==
- I, the Song (2024)
- Honeygiver Among the Dogs (2016)
- 3 Year 3 Month Retreat (2015)
- An Original Photocopy of Happiness (2011)
