= Music of Bhutan =

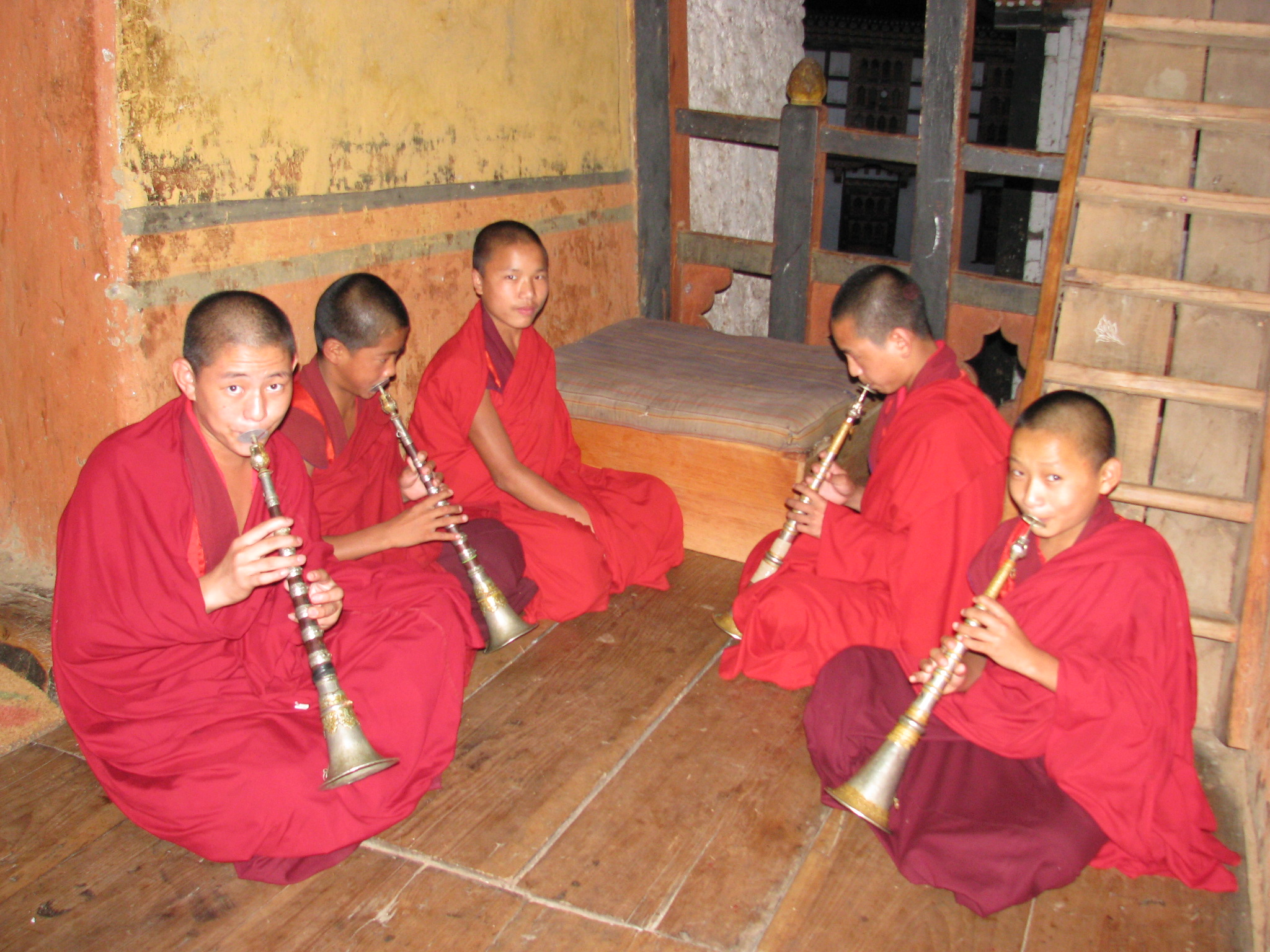
Monks playing lingm at Lhuentse Dzong

The music of Bhutan is an integral part of its culture and plays a leading role in transmitting social values. Traditional Bhutanese music includes a wide spectrum of subgenres, ranging from folk to religious song and music. Some genres of traditional Bhutanese music intertwine vocals, instrumentation, and theatre and dance, while others are primarily vocal or instrumental. The much older traditional genres are distinguished from modern popular music such as rigsar.

== Instruments ==
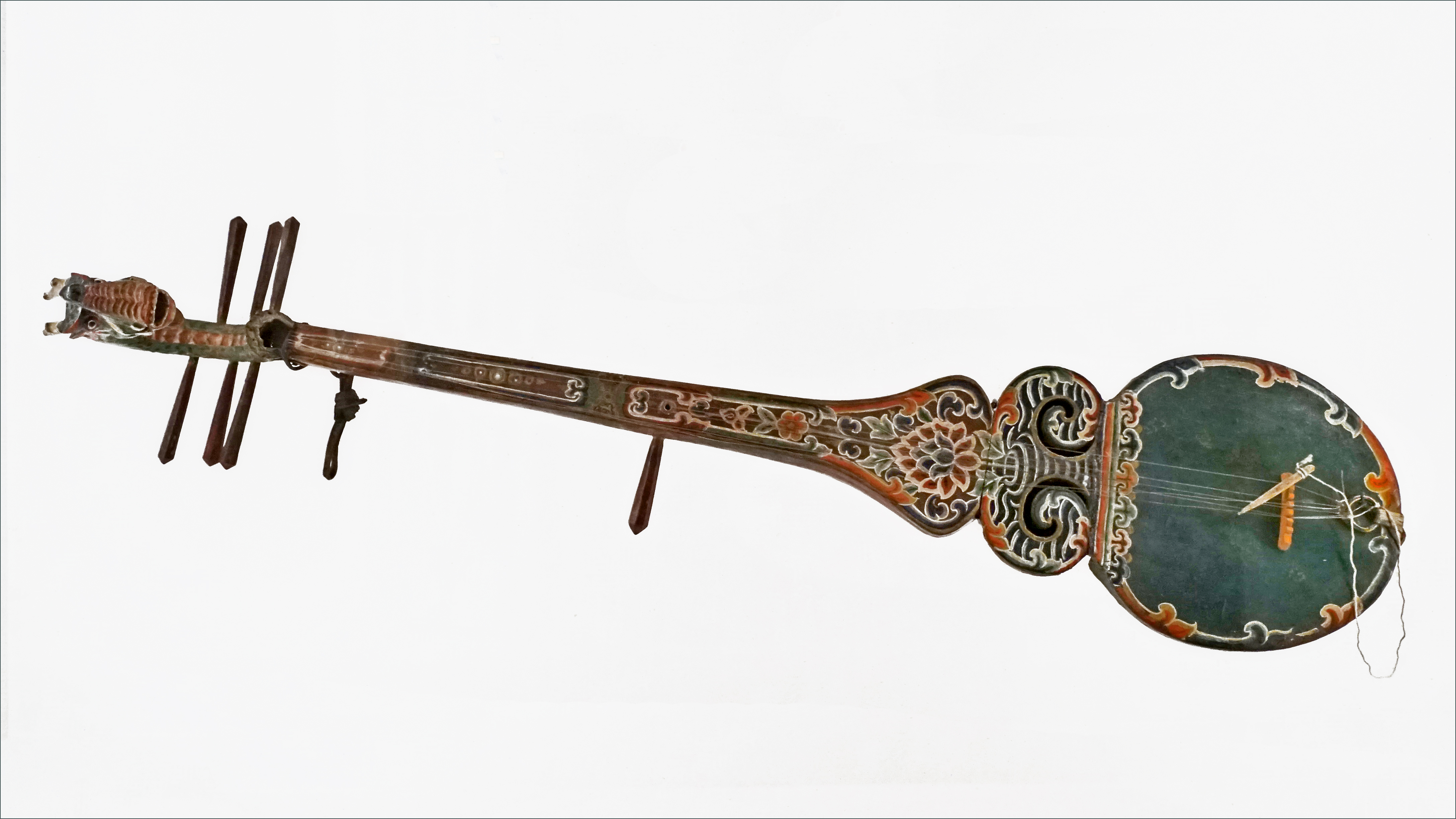
Bhutanese dranyen

Instruments used in both traditional and modern genres of Bhutanese music include the lingm (six-holed flute), the chiwang (Tibetan two-stringed fiddle), and the dramnyen (similar to a large three-stringed rebec); modern musicians often update these instruments for use in rigsar.

Other traditional instruments include tangtang namborong (four-holed bamboo bass flute), kongkha (bamboo mouth harp), and gombu (bull or buffalo horn). Newer instruments include the yangchen, brought from Tibet in the 1960s.

While Bhutanese folk music often employs stringed instruments, religious music usually does not. Unlike many countries, Bhutanese folk music is almost never incorporated into popular music.

== Religious music ==
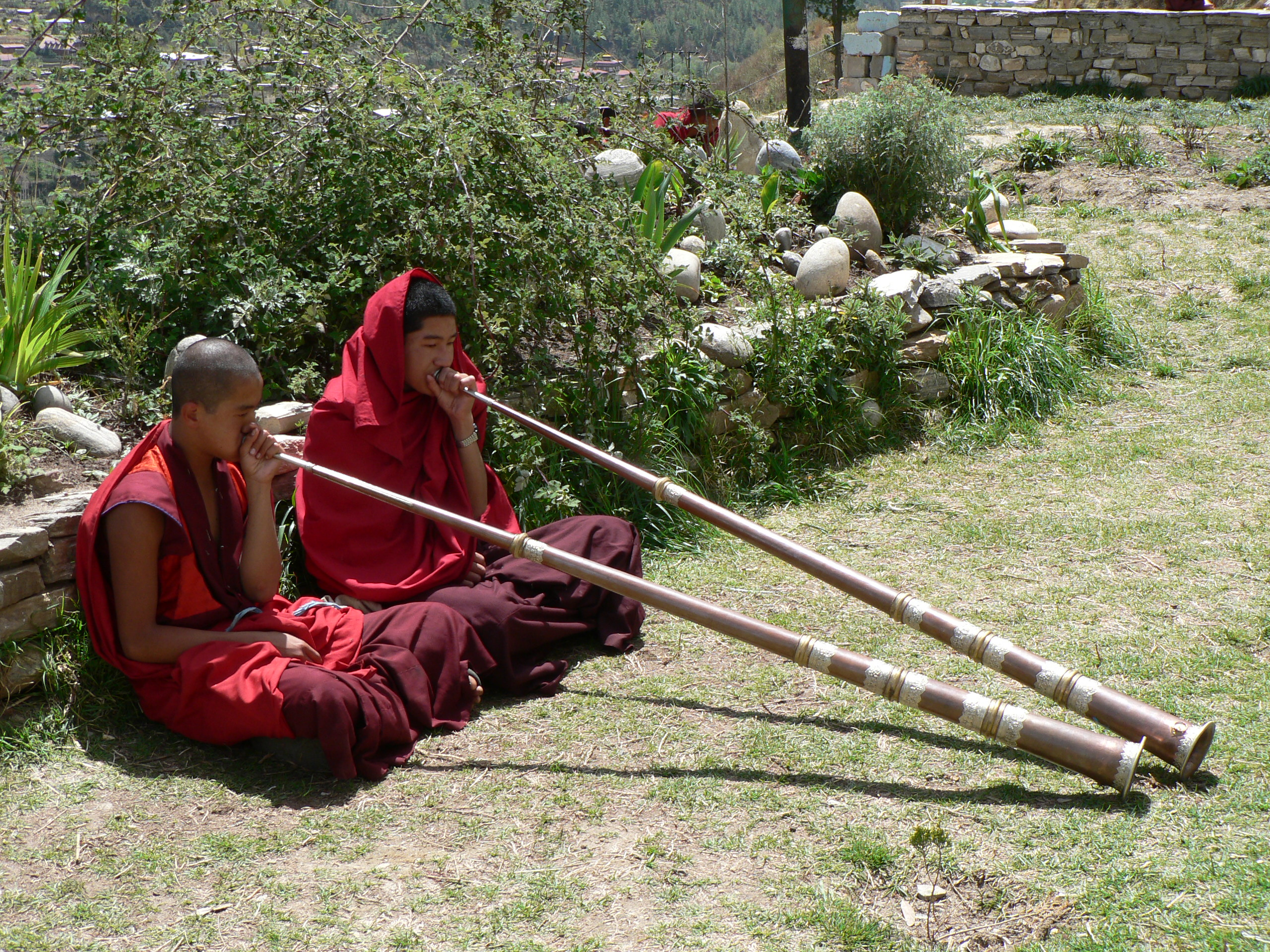
Monks playing dungchen, Dechen Phodrang monastic school, Thimphu

Bhutan was first united in the 17th century, during the reign of Zhabdrung Ngawang Namgyal (1594–1652); the same period saw a great blossoming of folk music and dance. Religious music is usually chanted, and its lyrics and dance often reenact namtars, spiritual biographies of saints, and feature distinctive masks and costumes. Today, Bhutan has a robust tradition of monastic song and music not normally heard by the general public. The language used in these lyrics is generally Chöke.

Cham

The Cham dance is one of the most conspicuous religious musical subgenres in Bhutan, and is shared among Tibetan Buddhists in Tibet and in other countries, having roots in the 8th century. Lama and founder of Bhutan Zhabdrung Ngawang Namgyal is also credited with introducing many masked dances into Bhutanese tradition. Performed during modern Bhutanese tsechus (festivals), cham dances act both to achieve enlightenment and to destroy evil forces in a sort of ritual purification. Ordinary people watch cham dances in order to receive a spiritual benefit and merit. The music and choreography of the cham dance are heavily associated with Tibetan Buddhism, however some common features derive directly from the Bön religion. The Dramyin Cham in particular is a focal point of many modern tsechus.

== Folk music ==
The influence of Drukpa Buddhism and Buddhist music on Bhutanese culture is such that many folk songs and chanting styles are derived from Drukpa music. While some lamas and monks are credited for composing certain Bhutanese folk music, the majority of its creators are unknown or anonymous. Like religious music, the lyrics of folk music are most often in literary Dzongkha or Chöke, however there are also several traditional songs in Khengkha and Bumthangkha.

Vocal and behavioral discipline for traditional singing requires thorough training in order to master the correct pitch, facial expressions, gestures, and overall conduct while performing.

Along with traditional music, masked dances and dance dramas are common participatory components of folk music, and feature prominently at Bhutanese tsechus (festivals). Energetic dancers wearing colorful wooden or composition face masks employ special costumes and music to depict a panoply of heroes, demons, death heads, animals, gods, and caricatures of common people. The dances enjoy royal patronage and preserve not only ancient folk and religious customs but also perpetuate the art of mask making.

Bhutanese folk songs include a variety of subgenres, including zhungdra and boedra, as well as several minor varieties such as zhey and zhem, yuedra, tsangmo, alo, khorey, and ausa. Traditional song and dance are also an integral part of archery in Bhutan, known for lyrics that range from literary and sublime to provocative and burlesque.

Zhungdra

Zhungdra (Dzongkha: གཞུང་སྒྲ་; Wylie: gzhung-sgra; "center music") is one of the two dominant forms of Bhutanese folk music. It was developed in the 17th century, and is associated with the folk music of the central valleys of Paro, Thimphu, and Punakha, the heart of the Ngalop cultural area. Although considered secular, the lyrics of zhungdra songs often tell Buddhist allegories, such as Yak Legbi Lhadar, in which the singer tells of his former life as a yak slaughtered in connection with a non-Buddhist ritual in the Gasa District.

Zhungdra is characterized by the use of extended vocal tones in complex patterns which slowly decorate a relatively simple instrumental melody. Untrained singers, even those with natural singing ability, typically find it challenging to sing zhungdra. This has reduced the popularity of zhungdra compared with rigsar, the fast-paced pop Bhutanese music style based on electronic synthesizers.

Boedra

Boedra (Dzongkha: བོད་སྒྲ་; Wylie: bod-sgra; "Tibetan music") is the second of the two dominant forms of Bhutanese folk music. Instrumentation for boedra often includes the chiwang, which symbolizes a horse. In contrast to Zhungdra, Boedra evolved out of Tibetan court music.

Zhey and zhem

The paired zhey and zhem (Dzongkha: གཞས་/གཞས་མོ་; Wylie: gzhas/gzhas-mo) are elaborately choreographed vocal performances often performed during tsechus (festivals). They contain elements of both zhungdra and boedra. The quick-stepped zhey are performed by men, while the more flowing zhem are women's dances. Zheys originate in the 17th century, and although there is considerable variety among contemporary zheys, most of them share common tunes and dance formats. Dancers originally performed barefoot and without any elaborate uniform, however the tradition of wearing long gowns, headgear and traditional boots was established in the 1970s.

In honor of the 2011 royal wedding, Bhutanese dancers performed four major zheys (Goen Zhey of Gasa, Wang Zhey of Thimphu, Nub Zhey of Trongsa, Woochupai Zhey of Paro) and four minor zheys (Auley of Laya, Locho of Sha, Bonghur Zhey of Haa, and Miritsemoi Zhey of Chukha).

The Goen Zhey is of central importance among all zheys. Its origins lie in the coming of Zhabdrung Ngawang Namgyal, the founder of Bhutan. According to tradition, when he came in 1616 to at Bangdekha below Wakeyla, a place between Gasa and Laya, the people of Goen in Gasa offered the elaborate dance. Requiring two days and 21 dancers to complete, the dance has 25 intricate steps. Dancers wear red woolen gho, black tego undershirt, and red-and-white kabney in the fashion of ancient warriors. The zheypon (dance master) wears an elaborate headdress.

The Woochhu Zhey, from the Wochu Village ("Jackal River Village"; modern Woochhu Village in Lungnyi Gewog, Paro), also bases its origin in Zhabdrung Ngawang Namgyal, first performed by a lama in the procession to receive the Zhabdrung.

One particularly endangered performance is the Wang Zhey of Thimphu. According to tradition, it began with a commoner from the Wang valley who went to Laya. On his way, he stopped at the Gasa tshechu where he saw Goen Zhey for the first time. Inspired, he stayed to learn it. After returning to Wang, he taught his people the zhey in exchange for a fee of salt for every song. In 1620, with small changes, it was performed in Thimphu during the consecration ceremony of Chagri Monastery. Thereafter, it was performed regularly in receptions for important Tibetan Drukpa lamas. Though the Wang Zhey was once routine in rabneys, archery matches, and weddings of well-to-do families, it is now less frequently performed, and young Bhutanese do not know its significance.

Tsangmo

Tsangmo (Dzongkha: ཙང་མོ་; Wylie: tsang-mo), also considered a literary genre, are very popular in Bhutan. They consist of sung couplets, the first of which describes a relevant scenario, followed by the second couplet, which conveys a point such as love, hate, abuse, or ridicule. Tsangmo may be sung in a call-and-reply fashion, and may be a means of competition.

Lozey

Lozey (Dzongkha: བློ་ཟེ་; Wylie: blo-ze), literally translated as "ornaments of speech," refer to two distinct vocal traditions. The first is a short exchange lines, while the second is a collection of ballads that vary from region to region. They all concern traditional customs, dress, and literature. Rich in metaphor, they are known and recited by ordinary people in modern language. Like Tsangmo, Lozey may be sung in a call-and-reply fashion, and may be a means of competition. Certain Lozey are sung in vernacular language.

== Popular music ==
The modern popular rigsar genre (Dzongkha རིག་གསར་; Wylie: rig-gsar; "new type") emerged in the 1960s. Rigsar can be contrasted from most traditional music in its updated electronic instrumentation, faster rhythm, and vernacular language, especially Dzongkha and Tsangla. Its context can also be contrasted, as rigsar is a common feature of Bhutanese television and film. Some of the earliest rigsar tunes were translations of contemporary popular Hindi songs. The first Bhutanese rigsar hit was Zhendi Migo, covered the popular Bollywood filmi song "Sayonara" from the film Love in Tokyo. Since the 1960s, a great number of Bhutanese artists have covered or produced a staggering volume of rigsar music.

Rigsar gained popularity on the Bhutan Broadcasting Service, making way for the rigsar band Tashi Nyencha to establish the first recording studio in Thimphu in 1991. Prior to this period, Bhutanese people primarily listened to filmi and other kinds of Indian pop music. Rigsar is the dominant style of Bhutanese popular music, and dates back to the late 1980s. The first major music star was Shera Lhendup, whose career began after the 1981 hit "Jalam Jalam Gi Ashi".

By the end of the 1980s, rigsar was no longer so popular, its detractors citing repetitive, simple tunes that were often copied directly from foreign music. Since 1995, with founding of the Norling Drayang recording label, rigsar has returned to relative popularity as a fusion of elements and instruments from English language pop, Indian and Nepalese music. Rigsar remains ubiquitous in Bhutan, heard in on public streets, in taxis, and on buses, and even used by the government to deliver health and sanitation education.

There is also a small underground metal scene with bands like Forsaken

Bhutan has also been seeing a boom in the popular music such as the B-Pop show that was held to promote creativity in May 2018 by M-Studio in collaboration with the Ministry of Information and Communications.

== Institutions ==
The Royal Academy of Performing Arts (RAPA) has worked under royal prerogative to document, preserve, and promote traditional Bhutanese music, song, and dance since 1954. Its activities are overseen by the Ministry of Home Affairs of the Government of Bhutan. The Academy's performers participate in festivals, tour schools within Bhutan, and perform for tourists.

The Institute of Language and Cultural Studies (ILCS) at Semtokha, Thimphu, was the only university level institute to offer elective courses on traditional and modern Bhutanese music, song, and dance as of 2003.

Aa-Yang Ensemble, started by Jigme Drukpa in 2010, is a private performing group. The ensemble includes members from north, east and south of Bhutan, making it one of the more culturally diverse music groups in Bhutan. In 2013 the group toured Sweden for 23 days.

Khuju Luyang, a private performing arts group with international stage presence. Khuju Luyang won the folk music and dance competition in 2006 and received the silver medal from the Royal Government of Bhutan for preservation of folk dance and music.

== See also ==
- Cham dance
- Culture of Bhutan
- Drayang
- Rigsar
- Royal Academy of Performing Arts
