= Culture of Bhutan =

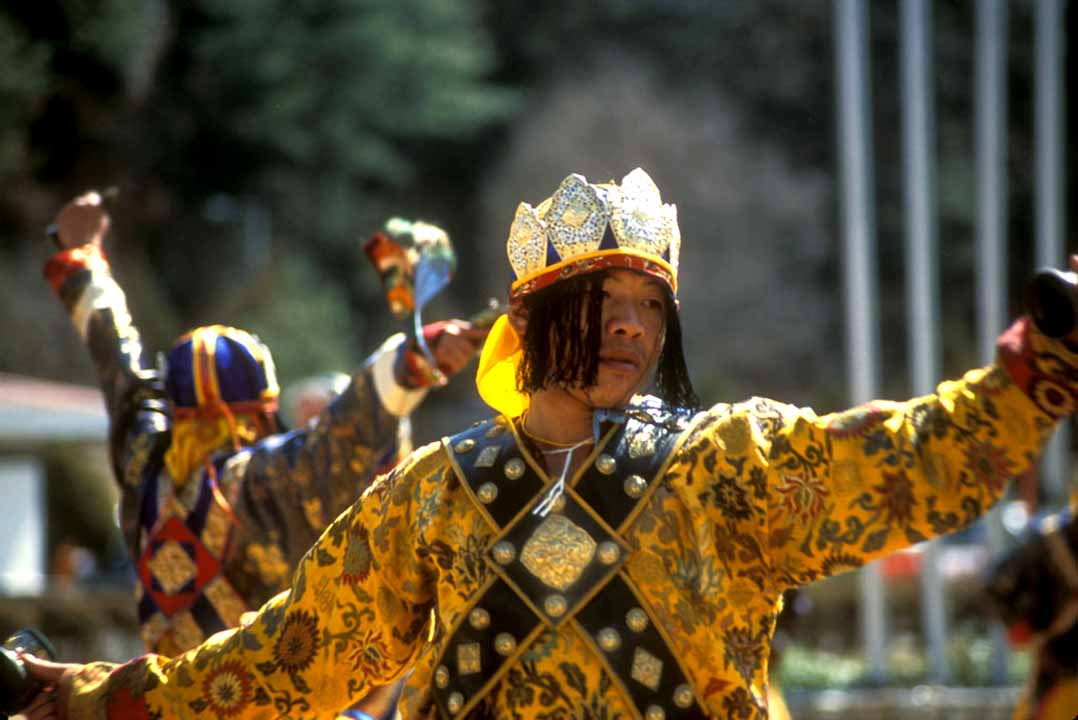
A music parade in Bhutan.

Cradled in the folds of the Himalayas, Bhutan has relied on its geographical isolation to protect itself from outside cultural influences. A sparsely populated country bordered by India to the south, and China to the north, Bhutan has long maintained a policy of strict isolationism, both culturally and economically, with the goal of preserving its cultural heritage and independence. Only in the last decades of the 20th century were foreigners allowed to visit the country, and only then in limited numbers. In this way, Bhutan has successfully preserved many aspects of its culture, which dates directly back to the mid-17th century.

Modern Bhutanese culture derives from ancient culture. This culture affected the early growth of this country. Dzongkha and Sharchop, the principal Bhutanese languages, are closely related to Tibetan, and Bhutanese monks read and write the ancient variant of the Tibetan language, known as chhokey. The Bhutanese are physically similar to the Tibetans, but history does not record when they crossed over the Himalayas and settled in the south-draining valleys of Bhutan. Both Tibetans and Bhutanese revere the tantric guru, Padmasambhava, the founder of Himalayan Buddhism in the 8th century.

== Religion ==
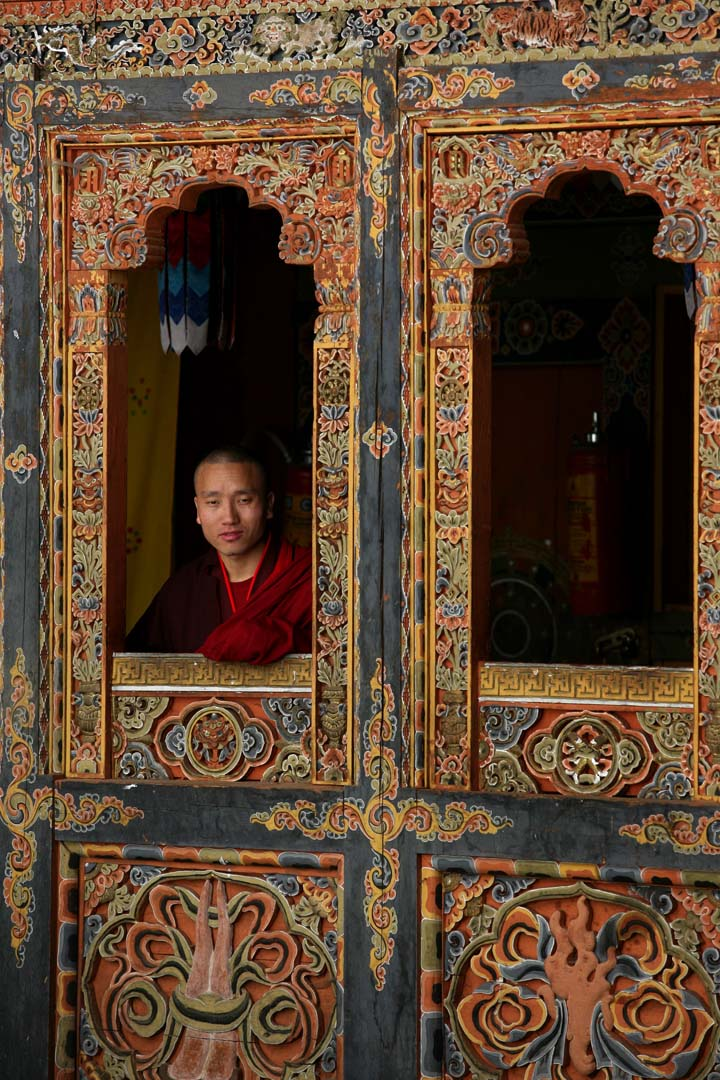
Bhutanese Buddhist monk looking out the window of a monastery.

Bhutanese society is centered around the practice of Buddhism, which is the main religion. Religious beliefs are evidenced in all aspects of life. Prayer flags flutter on hillsides, offering up prayers to benefit all nearby sentient beings. Houses each fly a small white flag on the roof indicating the owner has made his offering payments to appease the local god. Each valley or district is dominated by a huge dzong, or high-walled fortress which serves the religious and administrative center of the district.

Approximately 23% of the population is Hindu. There is a small Muslim population in Bhutan, covering 0.2% of the whole country's population. Overall, 75% of the population is Buddhist, and 0.4% other religions.

=== Religious festivals ===
Once every year, a dzong or most important village may hold a religious festival, or Tsechu. Villagers from the surrounding district come for several days of religious observances and socializing while contributing auspicious offerings to the lama or monastery of the festival. The central activity is a fixed set of religious mask dances, or cham, held in a large courtyard.

Each individual dance takes up to several hours to complete and the entire set may last two to four days. Observation of the dances directly blesses the audience and also serves to transmit principles of Tantric Buddhism to the villagers. A number of the dances can be traced directly back to Shabdrung Ngawang Namgyal himself, the founder of Bhutan, and have been passed down essentially unchanged since the mid-17th century.

Prior to dawn on the final day of the tsechu a huge tapestry, or thongdrel, is unfurled in the courtyard of the dzong for several hours. The mere sight of it is believed to bring spiritual liberation. The thongdrel is rolled up before the rays of the morning sun can strike it.

=== The monastery ===
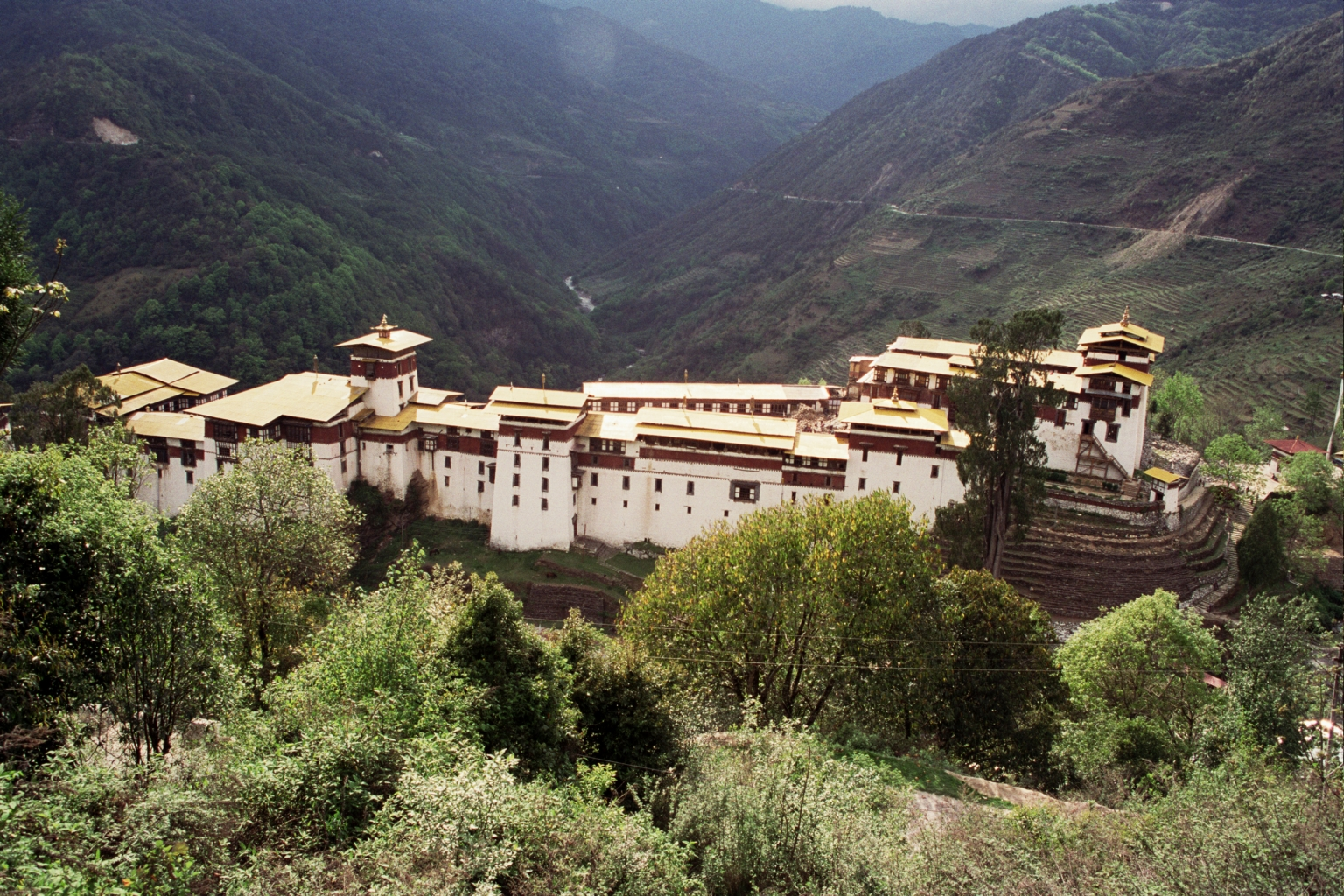
A dzong (Trongsa).

Monks join the monastery at six to nine years of age and are immediately placed under the discipleship of a headmaster. They learn to read chhokey, the language of the ancient sacred texts, as well as Dzongkha and English. Eventually they will choose between two possible paths: to study theology and Buddhist theory, or take the more common path of becoming proficient in the rituals and personal practices of the faith.

The daily life of the monk is austere, particularly if they are stationed at one of the monasteries located high in the mountains. At these monasteries food is often scarce and must be carried up by the monks or their visitors. The monks are poorly clothed for winter conditions and the monasteries are unheated. The hardship of such a posting is well-recognized; to have a son or brother serving in such a monastery is recognized as very good karma for the family.

A monk's spiritual training continues throughout his life. In addition to serving the community in sacramental roles, he may undertake several extended silent retreats. A common length for such a retreat is three years, three months, three weeks and three days. During the retreat time he will periodically meet with his spiritual master who will test him on his development to ensure that the retreat time is not being wasted.

Each monastery is headed by an abbot who is typically a Lama, although the titles are distinct. The highest monk in the land is the chief abbot of Bhutan, whose title is Je Khenpo. He is theoretically equivalent in stature to the king.

The Central Monk Body is an assembly of 600 or so monks who attend to the most critical religious duties of the country. In the summer they are housed in Thimphu, the nation's capital, and in the winter they descend to Punakha dzong, the most sacred dzong in Bhutan, where Shabdrung Ngawang Namgyal's mortal body has been kept under vigil since the late 17th century.

== Music ==
Bhutanese music has traditional genres such as Zhungdra, Boedra, and a modern genre called Rigsar. Bhutanese musicians include: Jigme Drukpa, who is also a leading Bhutanese musicologist.

== Official behavioural code ==
The Driglam Namzha is the official behaviour and dress code of Bhutan. It governs how citizens should dress in public and how they should behave in formal settings. It also regulates a number of cultural assets such as art and Bhutanese architecture. In English, driglam means "order, discipline, custom, rules, regimen" and namzha means "system," though the term may be styled "The Rules for Disciplined Behaviour."

It is a manner and etiquette as what to wear, how to eat, talk and bow down before the government officials and the clergy. The Driglam Namzha was imposed on all citizens from 1990. The people of different ethnic heritage for example the Lhotsampas (Bhutanese citizens of ethnic Nepali origin – they were not Bhutanese citizens and they were not Lhotsampas) resented this and revolted against this imposition, thereby getting kicked out of Bhutan to the refugee camps. About 20% of Bhutan's population currently live in exile because of this Bhutanization policies of the Royal Government followed by land expropriation and persecution.

To preserve the indigenous Buddha's Teachings as their long-guarded culture and tradition, Menjong Chöthün Tshogpa, a charitable organization was established in 2002 by The Supreme Dharma King or Trulku Jigme Chöda Rinpoche 70th Je Khenpo of Bhutan. The chairman at present is Trizin Tsering Rimpoche who also happens to be the founder of Buddha Dordenma Image Foundation, another charitable organization in Bhutan.

=== National dress code ===
Previously all Bhutanese citizens were required to observe the national dress code, known as Driglam Namzha, while in public during daylight hours. The rule was enforced more rigorously in some districts (dzongkhag) than others. Men wear a heavy knee-length robe tied with a belt, called a gho, folded in such a way to form a pocket in front of the stomach.

Women wear colourful blouses over which they fold and clasp a large rectangular cloth called a kira, thereby creating an ankle-length dress. A short silk jacket, or toego may be worn over the kira. Everyday gho and kira are cotton or wool, according to the season, patterned in simple checks and stripes in earth tones. For special occasions and festivals, colourfully patterned silk kira and, more rarely, gho may be worn.

Additional rules of protocol apply when visiting a dzong or a temple, or when appearing before a high-level official. Male commoners wear a white sash (kabney) from left shoulder to opposite hip. Local and regional elected officials, government ministers, cabinet members, and the King himself each wear their own colored kabney. Women wear a narrow embroidered cloth draped over the left shoulder, a rachu.

The dress code has met with some resistance from Lhotshampa, people of Nepali ancestry, living along the Indian border who resent having to wear a cultural dress which is not their own.

=== Bhutanization ===
Despite living in Bhutan for up to five generations, the Lhotsampas retained their highly distinctive Nepali language, culture, and religion. They participated in public life and politics, even attaining positions of significant leadership. The Lhotsampas coexisted peacefully with other ethnic groups in Bhutan until the mid 1980s, when Bhutan’s king and the ruling Druk majority became worried that the growing Lhotsampa population could threaten the majority position and the traditional Buddhist culture of the Druk Bhutanese.

The government therefore initiated a campaign, known as “One country, one people” or “Bhutanization,” to cement Bhutanese national identity. The policies imposed the Druk dress code, religious practices, and language use on all Bhutanese regardless of prior practices. These changes negatively impacted the Lhotsampa people, because they did not wear the same traditional dress, practice the same religion, or speak the same language as the northern Bhutanese. The use of the Nepali language was prohibited in schools, many Lhotsampa teachers were dismissed, and textbooks were burned.

== Men and women in society ==
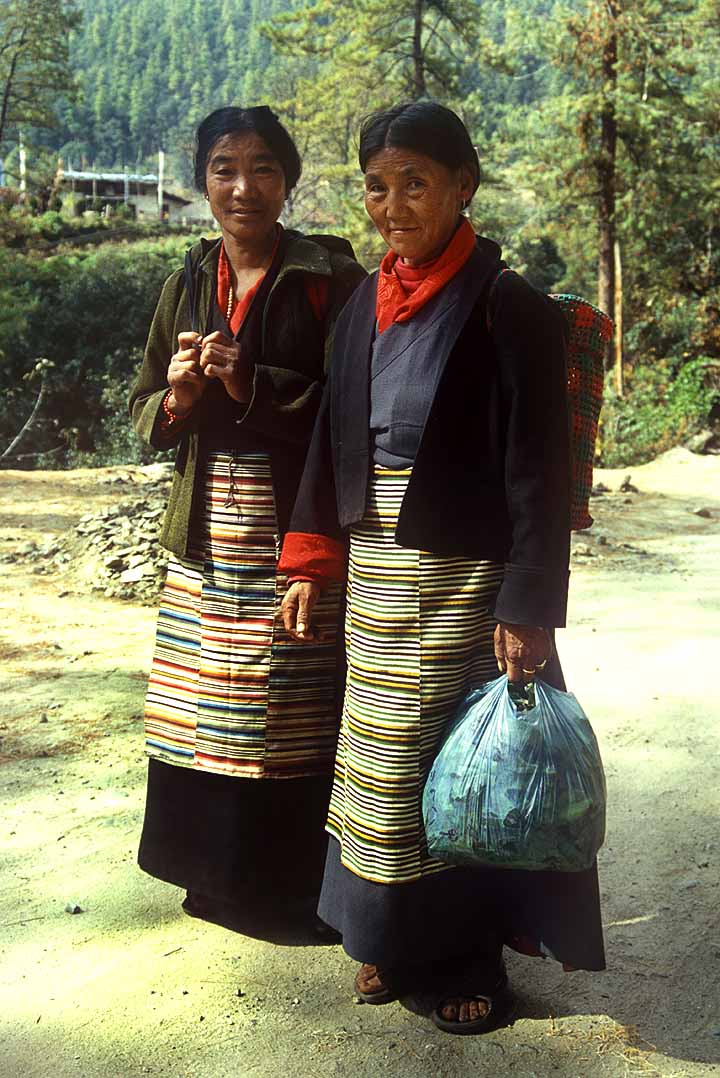
Bhutanese women of Tibetan descent in traditional clothing.

Men and women work together in the fields, and both may own small shops or businesses. Men take a full part in household management, often cook, and are traditionally the makers and repairers of clothing (but do not weave the fabric). In the towns, a more "western" pattern of family structure is beginning to emerge, with the husband as breadwinner and the wife as home-maker. Both genders may be monks, although in practice the number of female monks is relatively small.

Marriages are at the will of either party and divorce is not uncommon. The marriage ceremony consists of an exchange of white scarves and the sharing of a cup. Marriages can be officially registered when the couple has lived together for more than six months. Traditionally the groom moves to the bride's family home (matrilocality), but newlyweds may decide to live with either family depending on which household is most in need of labour.

In Asia, Bhutan is an unusual exception to the dowry custom which does not exist; inheritance is matrilineal, and daughters do not take their father's name at birth, nor their husband's name upon marriage. Rural land may be registered in a woman's name. Women own businesses, and both polyandry and polygyny are socially accepted, with polygyny being more prevalent. Sometimes a prospective groom will work in the bride's family's household to earn the right to marry her.

== Bhutanese names ==
Except for royal lineages, Bhutanese names do not include a family name. Instead two traditional auspicious names are chosen at birth by the local lama or by the parents or grandparents of the child. First names generally give no indication if the person is male or female; in some cases the second name may be helpful in that regard.

As there is a limited constellation of acceptable names to choose from, inevitably many people share the same combination of first and second names. To resolve the ambiguity an informal nicknaming system comes into play which recognizes where a person is from. If a certain "Chong Kinley" is from Chozom village in the Paro valley, she is called "Paro Kinley" when she is travelling outside the valley. In Paro valley itself she is identified by the name of her village, thus "Chong Kinley Chozom". Surprisingly, multiple children in a small hamlet of a few houses may have exactly the same name, reflecting the inspiration of the local lama. In this case, she is identified by the name of the house she was born in, thus "Chemsarpo" Kinley.

== Media ==
In the early 1960s, the Third King of Bhutan began the gradual process of introducing modern technology to the medieval kingdom. The first radio service was broadcast for thirty minutes on Sundays (by what is now the Bhutan Broadcasting Service) beginning in 1973. The first television broadcasts were initiated in 1999, although a few wealthy families had bought satellite dish as earlier. Internet service was established in 2000.

In 2002, the first feature-length movie was shot in Bhutan, the acclaimed Travellers and Magicians written and directed by Khyentse Norbu, the esteemed lama and head of the non-sectarian Khyentse lineage. The movie examines the pull of modernity on village life in Bhutan as coloured by the Buddhist perspective of tanha, or desire.

== Food ==
The staple foods of Bhutan are red rice (like brown rice in texture, but with a nutty taste, the only variety of rice that grows in high altitudes), buckwheat, and increasingly maize. The diet in the hills also includes chicken, yak meat, dried beef, pork, pork fat, and lamb. Soups and stews of meat, rice, ferns, lentils, and dried vegetables, spiced with chili peppers and cheese, are a favourite meal during the cold seasons.

Zow shungo is a rice dish mixed with leftover vegetables. Other foods include: jasha maru (a chicken dish), phaksha paa, thukpa, bathup, and fried rice.

Dairy foods, particularly butter and cheese from yaks and cows, are also popular, and indeed almost all milk is turned into butter and cheese. Popular beverages include: butter tea, black tea, locally brewed ara (rice wine), and beer. Popular spices include: curry, cardamom, ginger, thingay (Sichuan pepper), garlic, turmeric, and caraway.

When offered food, one says meshu meshu, covering one's mouth with the hands in refusal according to Bhutanese manners, and then gives in on the second or third offer.

=== Ema datshi ===
Ema datshi (Dzongkha: ཨེ་མ་དར་ཚི།) is a popular dish in Bhutan. It's also known as Bhutanese national dish.

== Sports ==
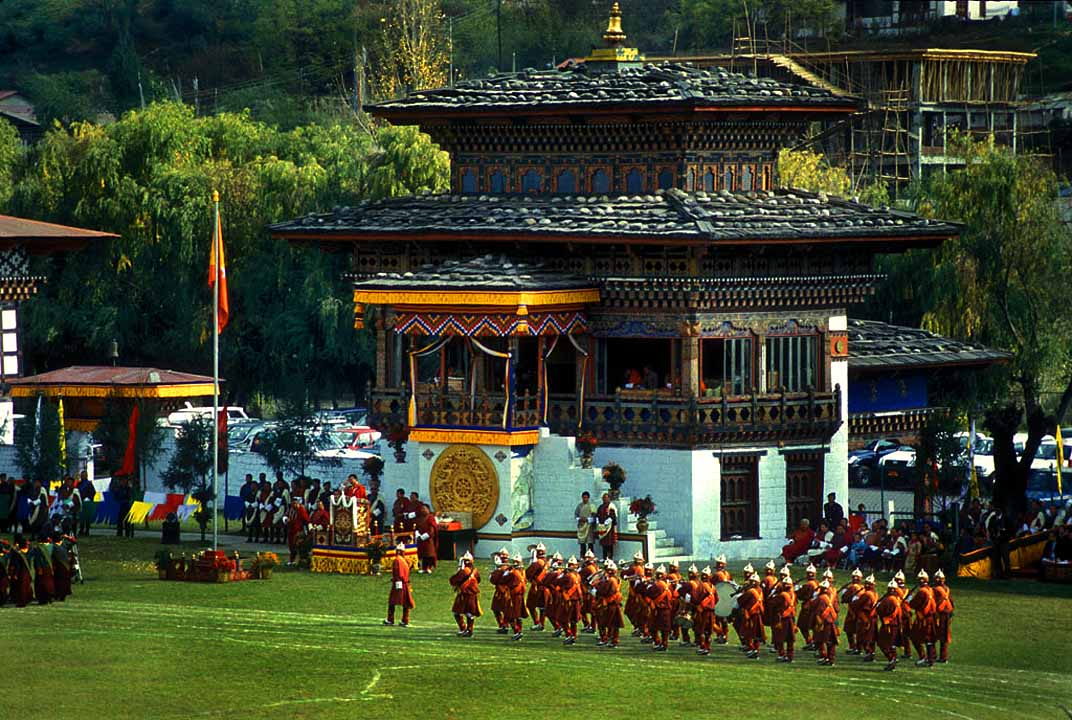
Changlimithang Stadium, during a parade.

Archery is the national sport in Bhutan, and competitions are held regularly in most villages. It differs from Olympic standards in technical details, such as the placement of the targets and atmosphere. There are two targets placed over 100 m apart and teams shoot from one end of the field to the other. Each member of the team shoots two arrows per round.

Traditional Bhutanese Archery is a social event, and competitions are organized between villages, towns, and amateur teams. There is usually plenty of food and drink complete with singing and dancing. Attempts to distract an opponent include standing around the target and making fun of the shooter's ability. Darts (kuru) is an equally popular outdoor team sport, in which heavy wooden darts pointed with a 10 cm nail are thrown at a paperback-sized target 10 to 20 m away.

Another traditional sport is digor, which resembles shot put and horseshoe throwing.

Football is the most popular sport in Bhutan. In 2002, Bhutan's national football team played Montserrat in what was billed as The Other Final; the match took place on the same day Brazil played Germany in the World Cup Final, and at the time Bhutan and Montserrat were the world's two lowest ranked teams. It was held in Thimphu's Changlimithang Stadium, and Bhutan won 4–0. Cricket has also gained popularity in Bhutan, particularly since the introduction of television channels from India. The Bhutan national cricket team is one of the most successful affiliate nations in the region.

== See also ==
- Architecture of Bhutan
- Bhutanese art
- Gross National Happiness
- Public holidays in Bhutan
- Royal Academy of Performing Arts
- Polygamy in Bhutan
- Tibetan culture
