= Chiwang =

Type of fiddle played in Bhutan

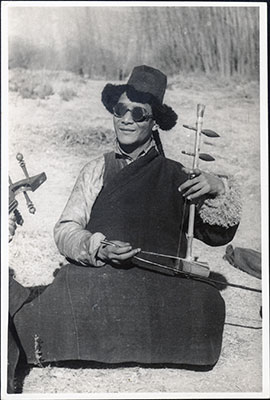
Acho Namgyal playing piwang in 1937

The chiwang (Dzongkha: སྤྱི་དབང་; Wylie: spyi-dbang) is a type of fiddle played in Bhutan. The chiwang, the lingm (flute), and the dramyen (lute) comprise the basic instrumental inventory for traditional Bhutanese folk music.

Although the chiwang is considered typically Bhutanese, it is a variety of the piwang, a Tibetan two-stringed fiddle. It is heavily associated with boedra, one of two dominant genres of Bhutanese folk music, in which it symbolizes a horse.

== See also ==
- Boedra
- Music of Bhutan
