= Waist (disambiguation) =

Waist is the narrow point of the body between the ribcage and hips. Other meanings derive from this by extension.

- Waist (clothing) is also a term for the bodice of a dress or for a blouse or woman's shirt.
- Waist, a variant of waistline, the line of demarcation between the upper and lower portions of a garment, which notionally corresponds to the natural waist but may vary with fashion from just below the bust to the upper hips
- Waist, the narrowest part of a laser beam, see Gaussian beam
- W.A.I.S.T., acronym for an international softball tournament held in West Africa every year
