= College of Language and Culture Studies (Bhutan) =

School at the Royal University of Bhutan

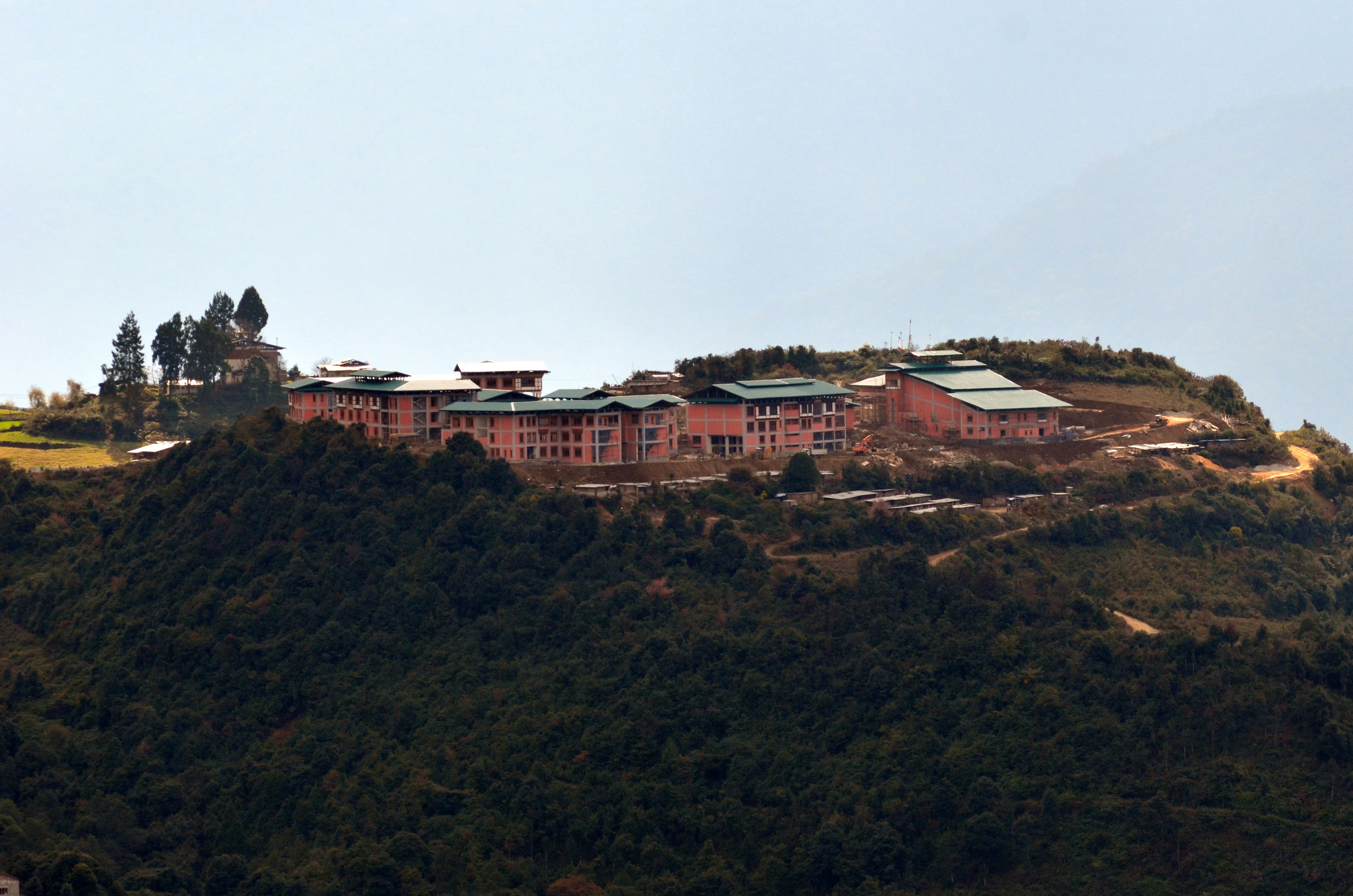
ILCS campus in Taktse, Bhutan

The College of Language and Culture Studies (CLCS) is a school at the Royal University of Bhutan in Taktse, Trongsa, central Bhutan. It was formerly known as the Institute for Language and Culture Studies (ILCS).

CLCS Bhutan logo

CLCS was founded in 1961 as a semi-monastic school at Wangditse. It later moved to Semtoka Dzong in Thimphu. It has now become a full degree awarding college with a focus in Buddhist philosophy, languages, Bhutanese culture, Himalayan studies, history and research in Bhutanese language and culture.

CLCS also admits international students as part of the study abroad programme. It offers courses both at the undergrad as well as at the masters level. The college grants Bachelors of Arts in Language and Literature (bilingual), and Bhutanese and Himalayan Studies. It also confers Diplomas in Language and Communication Skills.

CLCS has over 1000 students and over 60 faculty members. The primary task of the college is to preserve and promote Dzongkha, the national language of Bhutan.
