= Royal Academy of Performing Arts =

Bhutanese government body

- Abbreviation: RAPA
- Formation: 1952
- Type: Government body
- Legal status: Active
- Purpose: Cultural preservation and promotion
- Location: Thimphu, Bhutan
- Coordinates: 27.48°N 89.64°E
- Region served: Bhutan
- Official language: Dzongkha, other languages of Bhutan
- Principal: Phub Wangdi
- Parent organization: Ministry of Home Affairs (Bhutan)
- Affiliations: Government of Bhutan

The Royal Academy of Performing Arts (RAPA) renamed as the Traditional Performing Arts and Music Division is a Bhutanese government body within the Ministry of Home Affairs, Department of Culture and Dzongkha Development, that supports the preservation of traditional Bhutanese culture. It was founded in 1954 under the initiative of the Third Druk Gyalpo Jigme Dorji Wangchuck. In 1967, it was institutionalised as an academy and the Royal Dance troupe was its creation. The Academy is located in Thimphu, along Chhophel Lam.

== Activities ==
The Academy trains young dancers and musicians in both religious and secular folk music and dance. The Academy also documents and performs live songs and dances from Bhutan's many diverse regions – from modern rigsar to centuries-old genres – and publishes its collections.

The professional dancers of the Academy hold performances during the annual Thimphu Tsechu dance festival held at Tashichho Dzong. Throughout the year, its members give one-hour performances for guests and tour groups on request. The Academy also hosts public dance practices ahead of major events, such as the 2011 royal wedding, and performs abroad.

Leaders of the Academy further participate in international private nonprofit organizations promoting and preserving traditional Bhutanese music and culture.

== See also ==
- Music of Bhutan
- Culture of Bhutan
