= Cham dance =

Traditional Buddhist dance

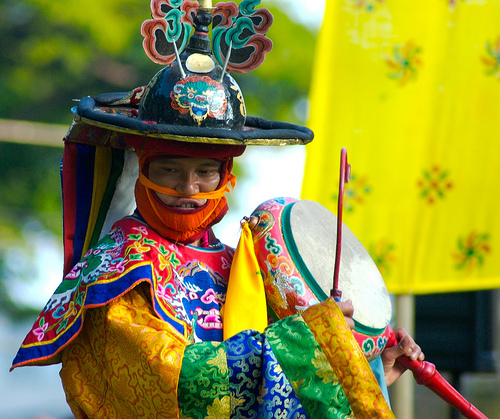
The Black-Hat Drum Cham (Wylie: zhwa nag rnga 'cham, THL: zhanak ngacham), performed at the Honolulu Museum of Art.

Cham dance at Kumbum Monastery on 2 March 2026, Qinghai, China.

The cham dance (Tibetan: འཆམ་, Wylie: 'cham) is a lively masked and costumed dance associated with some sects of Tibetan Buddhism and Buddhist festivals. The dance is accompanied by music played by monks using traditional Tibetan musical instruments. The dances often offer moral instruction relating to karuṇā (compassion) for sentient beings and are held to bring merit to all who perceive them.

Chams are considered a form of meditation and an offering to the gods. The leader of the cham is typically a musician, keeping time with a percussion instrument like cymbals, the one exception being Dramyin Cham, where time is kept using dramyin.

The term "devil dance" was an early 20th century description of the performance, derived from Western perceptions of the costumes worn by performers.

== Content ==
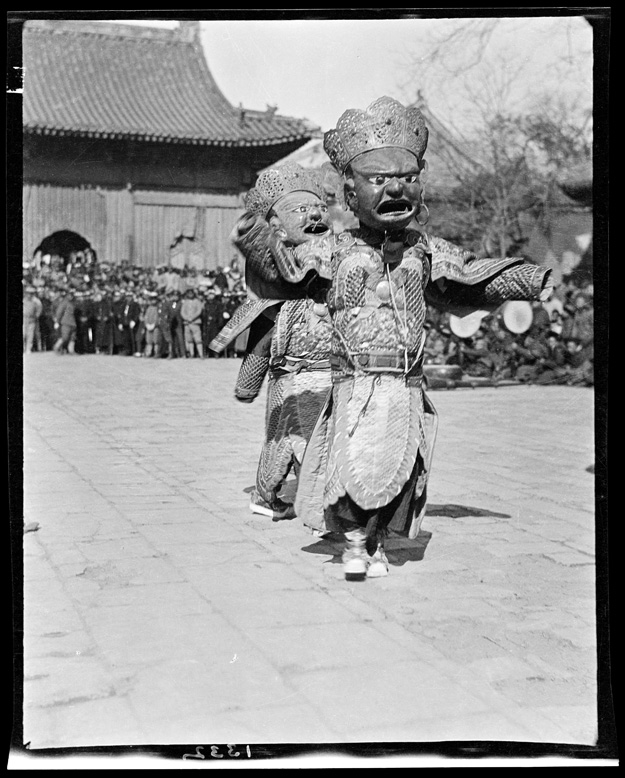
Two dancers during a cham dance at a temple in Beijing, 1 March 1919.

Chams often depict incidents from the life of Padmasambhava, the 9th century Nyingmapa teacher, and other saints.

The great debate of the Council of Lhasa between the two principal debators or dialecticians, Moheyan and Kamalaśīla is narrated and depicted in a specific cham dance held annually at Kumbum Monastery in Qinghai. One iteration of this dance is performed on the eve of Losar, the Tibetan new year, to commemorate the assassination of the cruel Tibetan king, Langdarma in 841 CE by a monk called Lhalung Pelgyi Dorje. The monk, dressed in a black robe and a black hat, danced outside the palace until he was allowed to perform in front of the emperor, then assassinated him. It is a dance symbolising the victory of good over evil.

The Black Hat dance is a Vajrakilaya dance and is the dance most frequently depicted in paintings. The dance is performed by Buddhist monks and operates in two levels, to achieve enlightenment and to destroy evil forces. The dancers often hold a skull and scarf tied together and then attached to the hilt of a purba.

== Localities ==
=== Bhutan ===
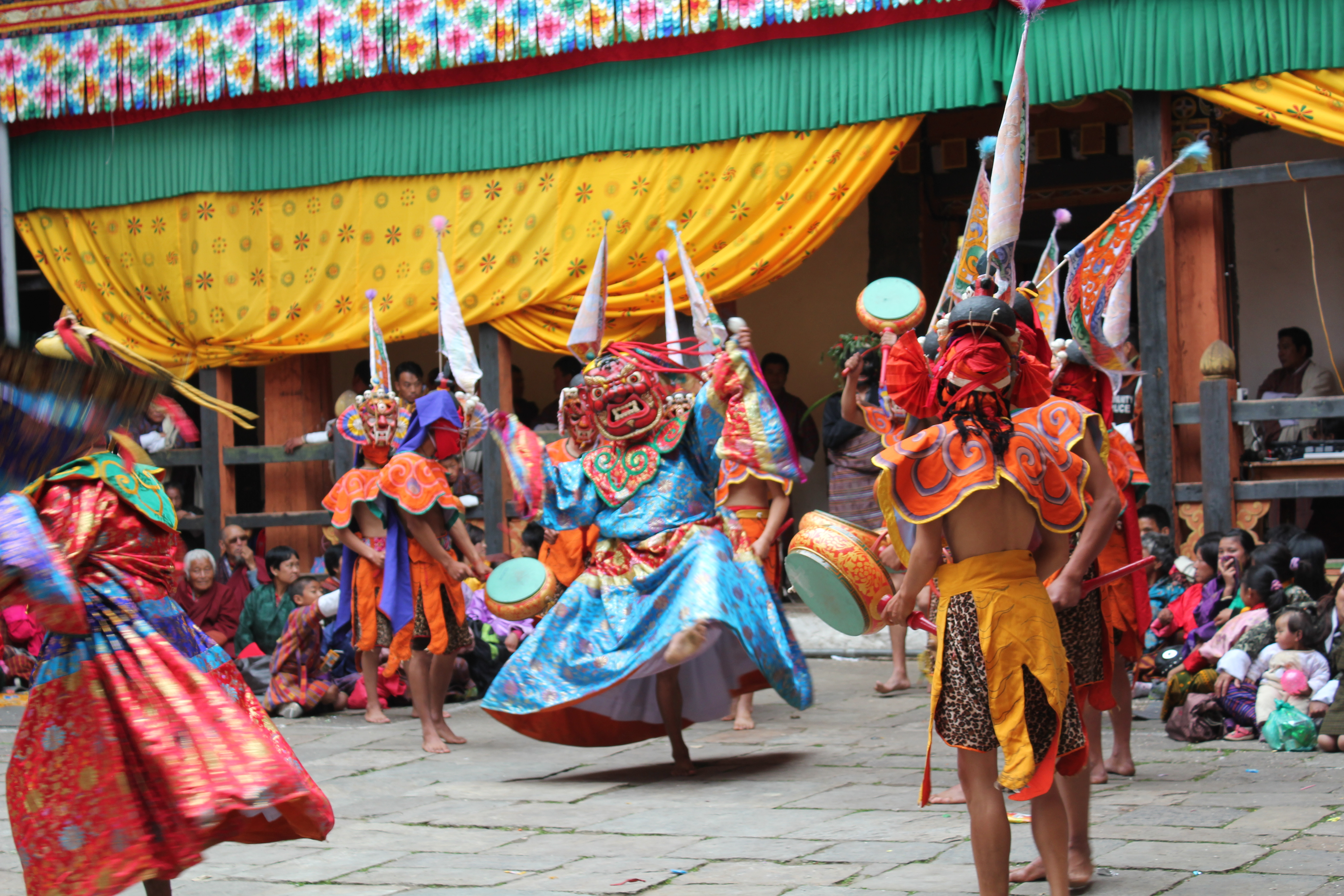
Dzongkhag dancers during a Tshechu in Jakar, Bhutan, 14 October 2013.

In Bhutan, the dances are performed during the annual religious festivals or tshechu, held in the dzong in each district. The Cham is performed by monks, sometimes nuns and villagers. The Royal Academy of Performing Arts is the main body which promotes the preservation of the culture of Cham. This honors Guru Rinpoche (Padmasambhava) and celebrates his deeds through the performance of sacred dances. Since Guru Rinpoche was a fully enlightened being, he is extremely important in Bhutan and it is through his teachings that Bhutanese devotees are shown the true and fast path to enlightenment. These dances assist in cultivating faith and understanding of the Guru deeds, and as such both honor and educate the attendees.

=== India ===
Dances are performed during cultural and religious festivals in:

- Lahaul and Spiti district
- Sikkim
- Dharamshala
- Kalimpong
- Darjeeling (Sangchen Dorjee Gompa)
- Pedong,
- Karnataka
- Bylakuppe ([Nyingma gompa/Golden temple])
- Ladakh
- Tawang

=== Mongolia ===
Tsam (Mongolian: Цам) dance was not introduced to Mongolia until the early 19th century, however it rapidly gained popularity and visibility with celebrations such as the Tsam festival and the opera Tale of the Moon Cuckoo. Tsam came to incorporate both tantric and older, shamanistic elements of dance. It became a significant part of Buddhism in Mongolia before it was banned under communist rule in 1924. The Stalinist purges in Mongolia destroyed over 700 monasteries, killed tens of thousands of Mongolian monks and lamas, and forcibly laicized thousands more monks. The mass murder of so much of Mongolia's monastic culture seriously threatened the tsam dance with extinction, as few practitioners survived the purges. With the dissolution of the Soviet Union in 1991 and the introduction of a new constitution permitting religious practices, the practice and performance of tsam dancing has grown enormously. Many of the costumes and masks used for tsam dances survived Soviet purges of monasteries and temples by being buried, hidden, or stored in museums such as the Choijin Lama Temple Museum.

=== Tibet ===
Tibetans usually perform chams to large audiences during the Monlam Prayer Festival. A group of around fifteen Buddhist monks performing a "devil dance" at the Rongbuk Monastery in 1922, watched by a large crowd of Tibetans and the Rongbuk Lama, is featured in Part III of the black and white silent film "Climbing Mt. Everest" (for around 10 minutes, starting 39 minutes into the film).

== See also ==
- Chöd
- Nechung Oracle
- Trance
