= Sonam Lhamo =

Bhutanese actress (born 1988)

Sonam Lhamo (born 1988) is a Bhutanese actress. She is best known for playing one of the leading roles in the 2003 film Travellers and Magicians. Lhamo plays a young hitchhiker in the movie, accompanying her farmer father to the city. Lhamo was fourteen years old (her character said she was nineteen years old) when she acted in the film.
