= Dramyin =

Himalayan folk music lute with six strings

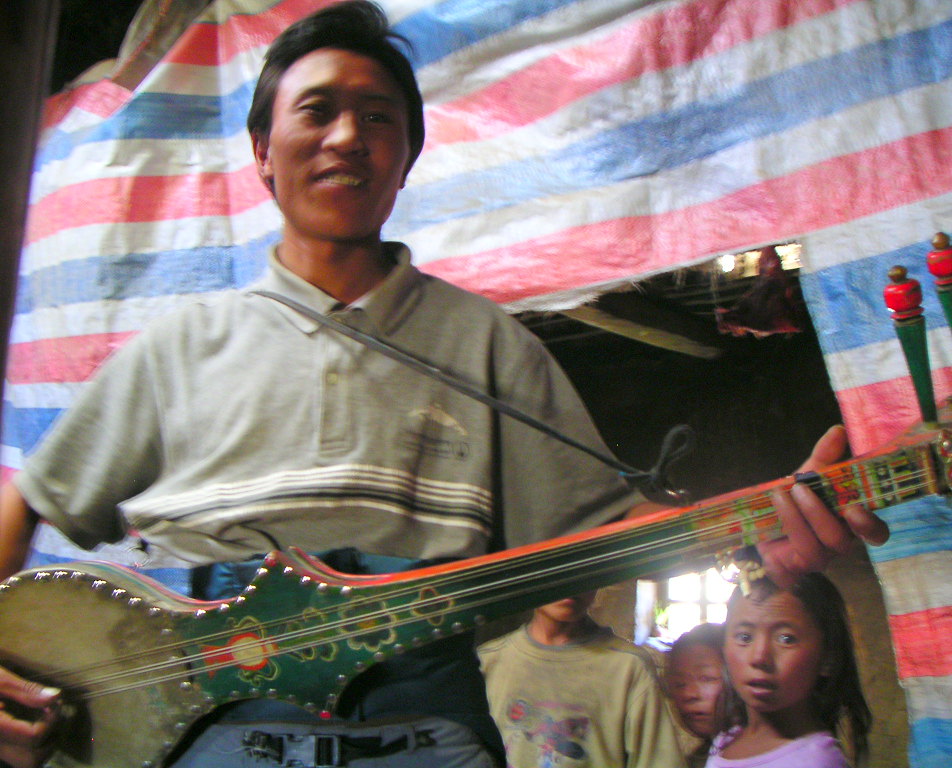
- Tibetan man playing a dranyen.

String instrument
- Other names: Dranyen, dramnyen
- Classification: String instrument Plucked string instrument
- Hornbostel–Sachs classification: 321.321-6 (necked bowl lute, a chordophone with permanently attached resonator and neck, played with plectrum)

Related instruments
- rubab; Pamiri rubab; Tungna

The dramyin or dranyen (Tibetan: སྒྲ་སྙན་, Wylie: sgra-snyan; Dzongkha: dramnyen; Chinese: 扎木聂; pinyin: zhamunie) is a traditional Himalayan folk music lute with six strings, used primarily as an accompaniment to singing in the Drukpa Buddhist culture and society in Bhutan, as well as in Tibet, Ladakh, Sikkim and Himalayan West Bengal. It is often used in religious festivals of Tibetan Buddhism (cf. tshechu). The instrument is played by strumming, fingerpicking or (most commonly) plucking. The dramyen, chiwang (fiddle), and lingm (flute) comprise the basic instrumental inventory for traditional Bhutanese folk music.

== Structure ==
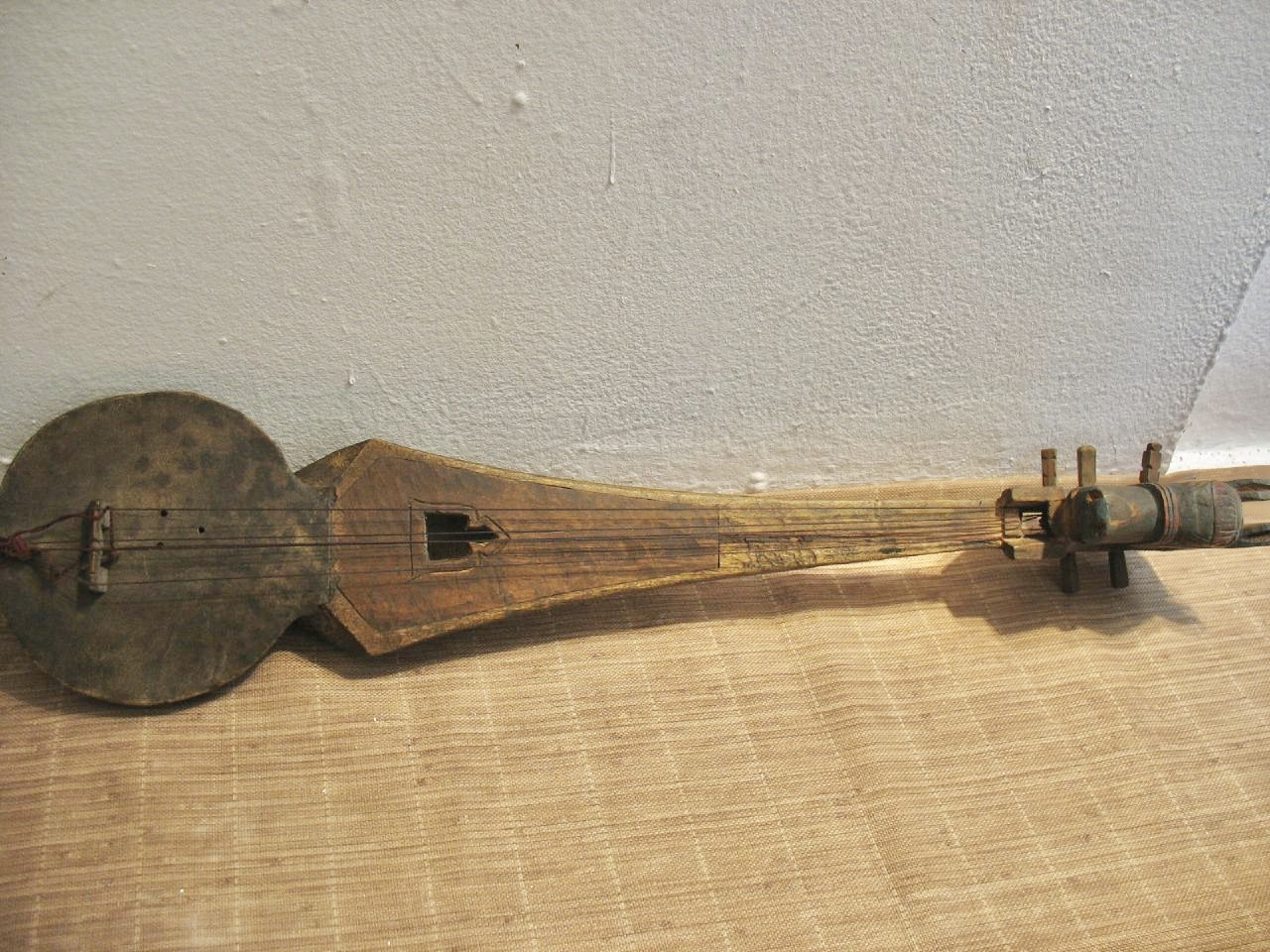
A Nepalese Dranyen, called a tungna (Nepali: टुङ्ना).

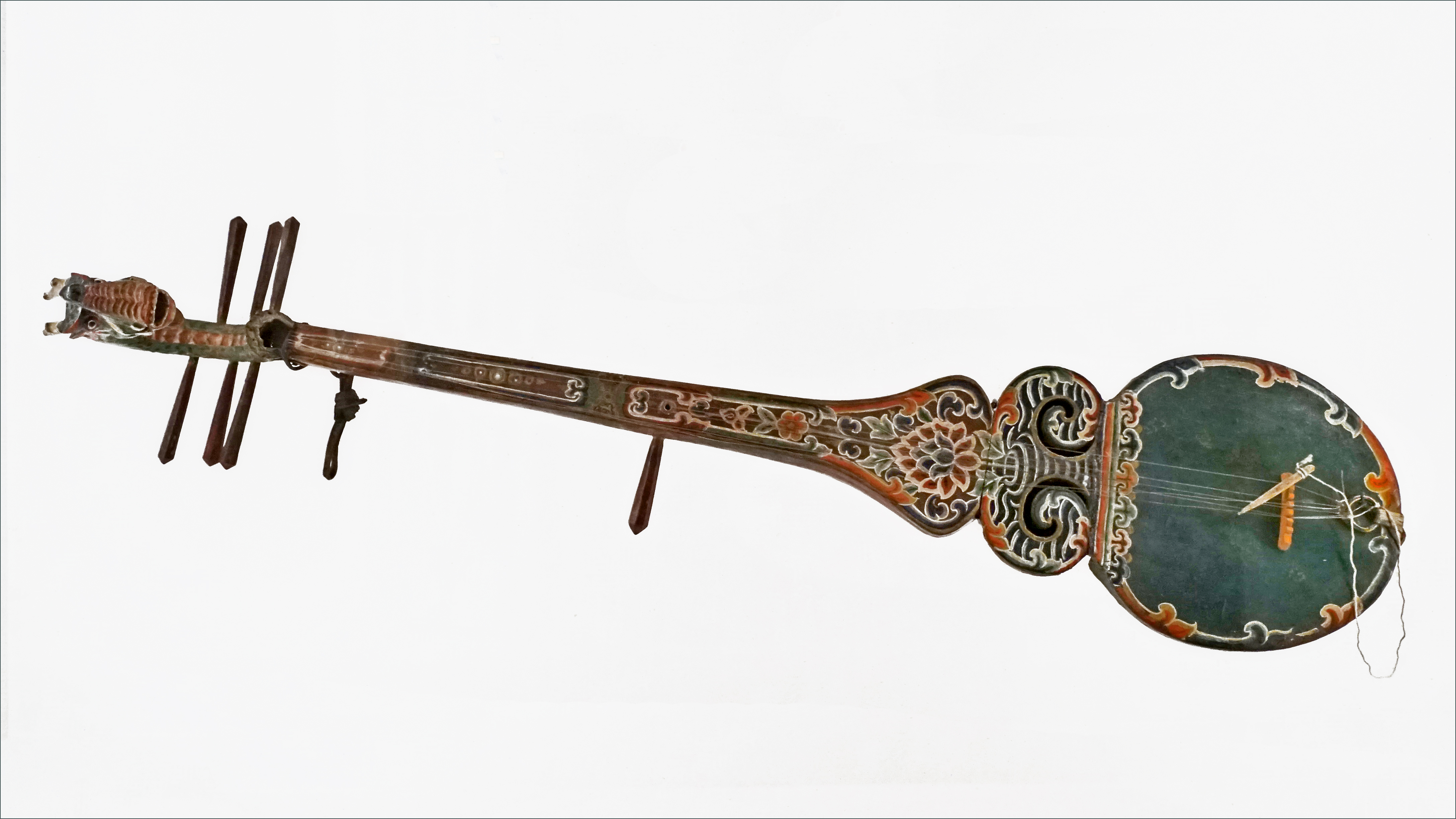
Bhutanese dranyen at the ethnography museum, Neuchâtel, Switzerland.

The dranyen is a long-necked, double-waisted and fretless lute. It is usually hollowed out of a single piece of wood and can vary in size from 60 cm to 120 cm in length. Unlike a contemporary guitar, the dranyen does not have a round sound hole in the wooden sounding board, but rather rosette-shaped ones like a lute.

For 6 string dranyen all six strings continue to the pegbox. They run in 3 double courses. This is a common Tibetan style. 7 string dranyen are a common Bhutanese style. Of this styles's seven strings, or thag, only six continue to the pegbox. Thus, six tuning pegs are located in the pegbox, while one (typically corresponding to the string which is third from the left) is located in the neck itself. Strings were originally made from animal gut, but are presently made from synthetic material like nylon (similar to the progression in usage of guts in racquet sports). The seven strings occur in two double courses, and one triple course. These become three double courses by the time they reach the pegbox.

Traditional dranyens are equipped with a single bridge. Resonance is achieved with a taught, thick animal skin. Certain older forms of the dranyen possessed sympathetic strings and under-strings to produce more resonance.

Some dranyens come with a plectrum attached to the base for plucking. Plectrums were traditionally made of bone, but are now made of plastic or wood.

It is often ornately and colourfully painted or carved with religious symbols and motifs, and its pegbox is often impressively carved into a "C" shape resembling a chusing, a type of sea monster. Tassels may be hung from the horns of the chusing to give the instrument a more frightening look.

== Tuning and playing technique ==
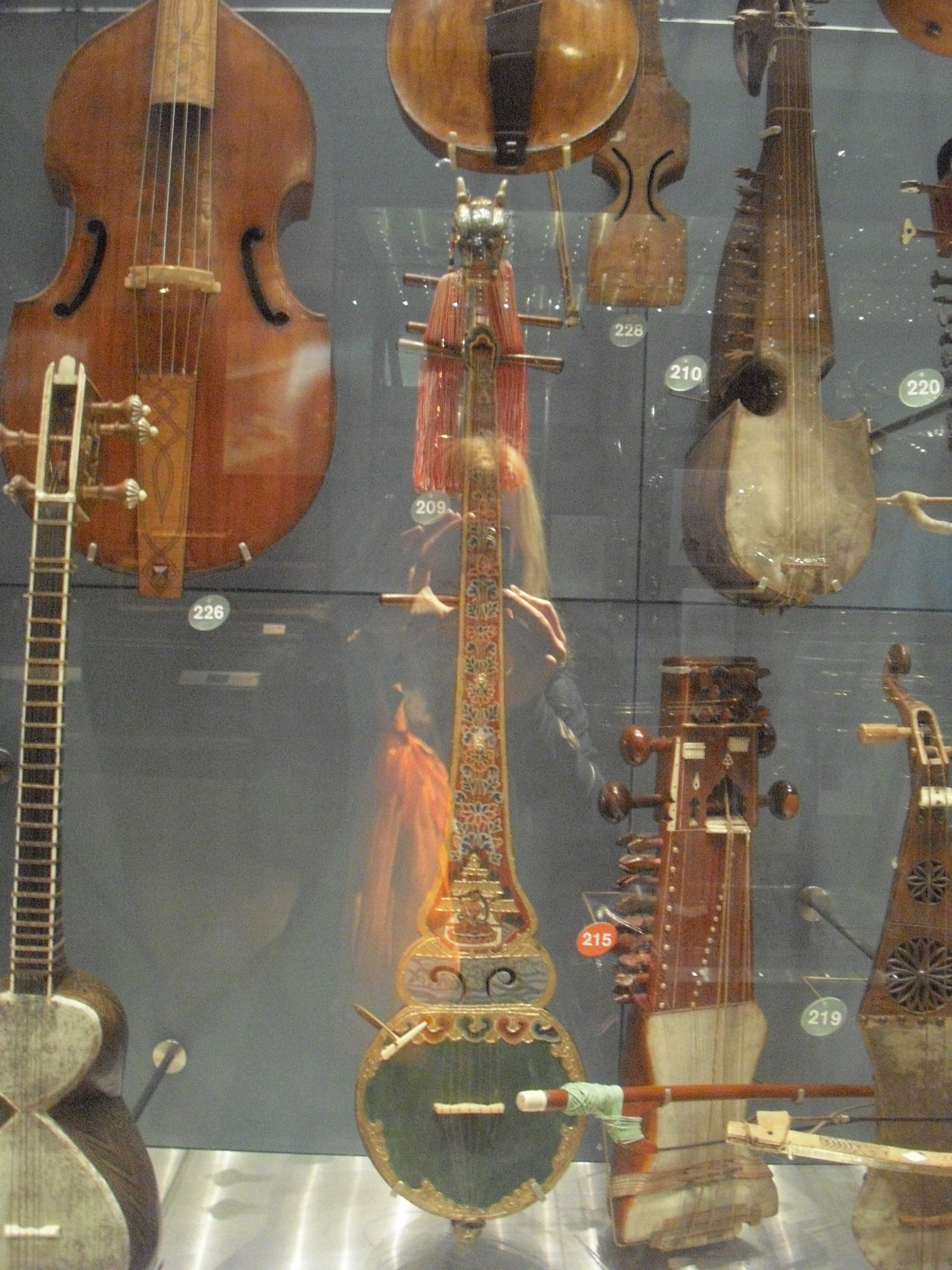
A dranyen (centre) in the Horniman Museum, London, UK.

The triple (usually middle) course of the dramyin typically contains the half string on the left, which is usually tuned an octave above the middle unison strings. One of the other two courses are typically tuned an octave apart. The courses are normally plucked in unison during playing. Typically a single note is played at a time, making for melodic music and not harmony. Dranyens may also be played to keep time, in a rhythmic fashion.

One standard tuning for the dranyen is: g G c' c c f f.

The standard way of plucking a course is down and up. One of the two strings in the course is plucked in a downward motion, and the other in the upward motion. The downward motion is typically louder than the other.

== Cultural significance ==
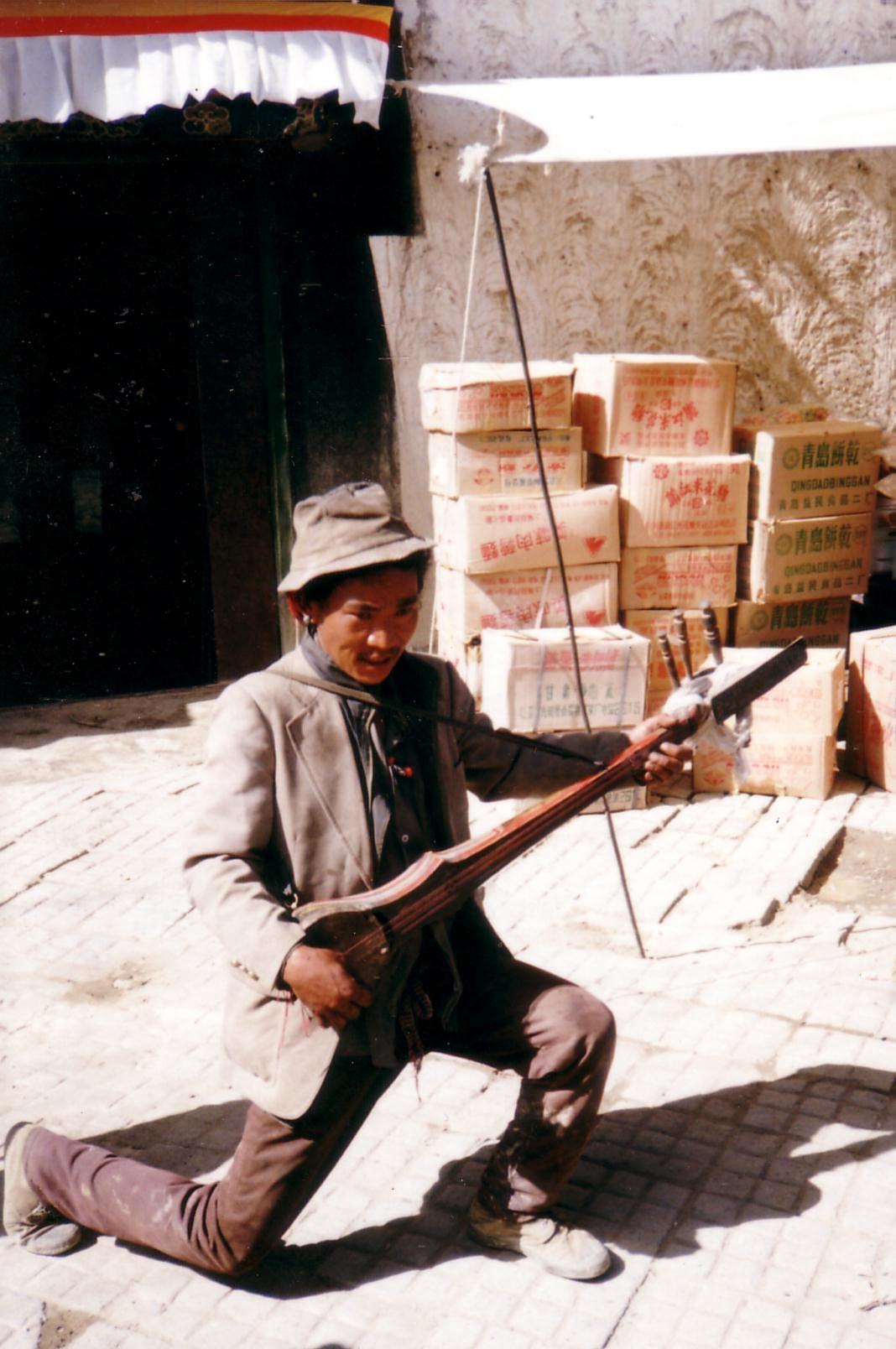
Tibetan street-musician

Dramyins are often used as accompaniment while narrating stories for providing ambience and keeping time, as shown in the Bhutanese film Travellers and Magicians

Dramyins are notably used in the performance of Dramyin Cham – a cham dance of subjugation performed by Drukpa monks during the singing of Dramyin Choeshay – a religious song. These are performed at religious festivals called tsechus – banned in Tibet, but continuing unabated in Bhutan much as they have been for the past four centuries. The dramyin music in the cham is notable as it is one of the very few instances of stringed instruments in monastic music in Bhutan, or for that matter in Tibetan Buddhism in general. A dramyin player leads the dance and keeps time for the dancers by plucking the instrument. In many chams, the place of the dramyin is taken by a percussion instrument, usually the cymbals.

The dranyen is generally regarded as a secular instrument, and the performance of a Dranyen Cham or Dranyen Choeshay are one of the few instances when the dranyen is allowed to be played inside a monastery or a Dzong. However, dranyens are often depicted on thongdrels (Tibetan: thankas) and given as offerings to deities. The guardian king of the Eastern direction – Sharchop Gyalpo (identified with Dhritarashtra of Hindu mythology) is associated with a dranyen in religious iconography.

The dranyen's melodious sound is supposed to attract demons, and the role of the carved chusing on the pegbox acts to ward off demons. The dranyen is associated with a guardian deity in the Dranyen Cham.

== Popular culture and modern variants ==
Rigsar is a popular music arising in Bhutan. Rigsar music often makes extensive use of the dranyen, although the traditional dranyen is typically modified into the rigsar dranyen by Bhutanese musician Sonam Dorji, for use in such popular music. The rigsar dranyen has 15 strings, two bridges and an extra set of tuning keys.

== See also ==
- Music of Bhutan
- Music of Tibet
- Tibetan Institute of Performing Arts
- Arbajo
- Tungna
