= Jigme Drukpa =

Bhutanese musician

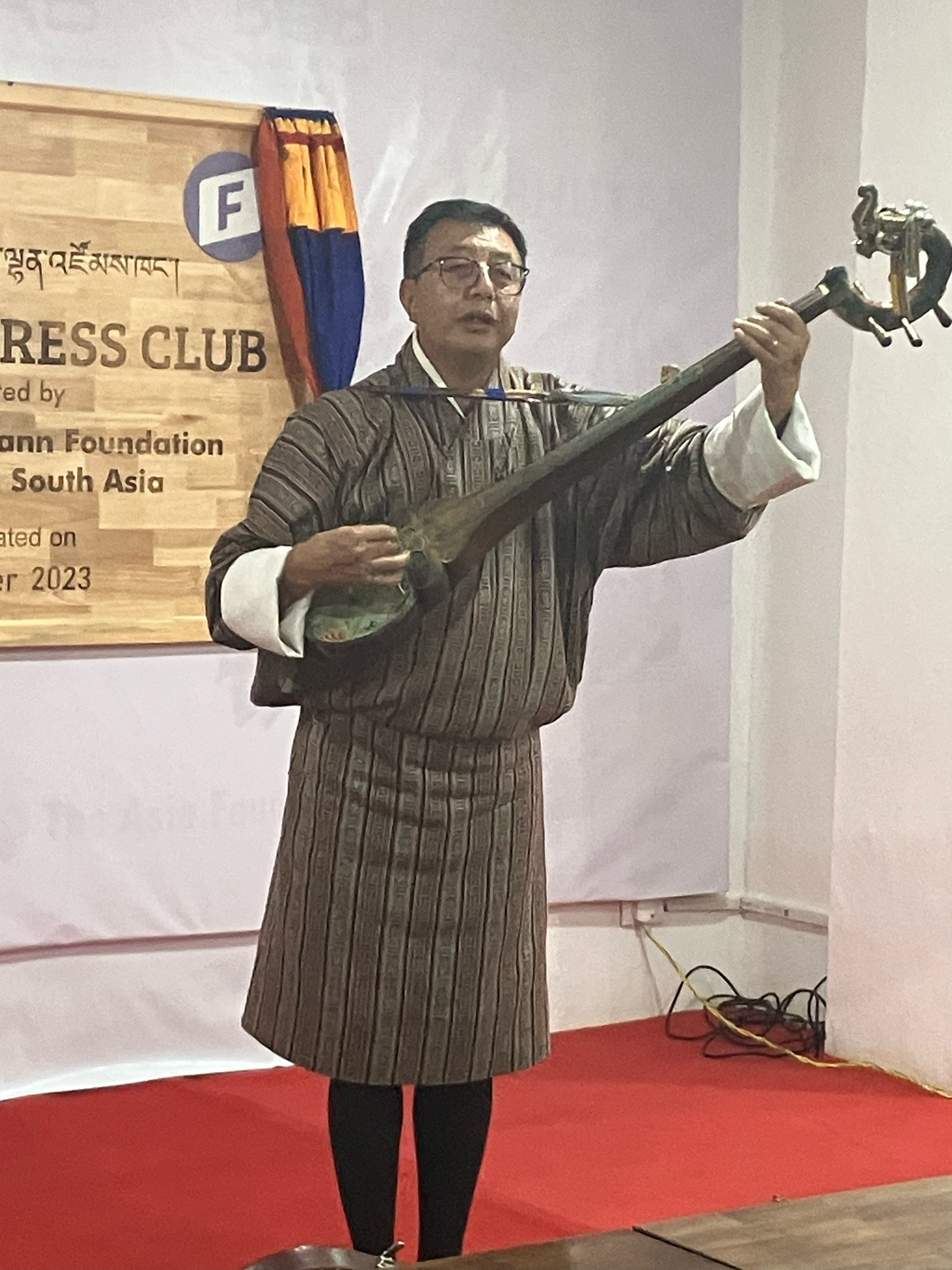
- Bhutanese musician Jigme Drukpa playing the dramyin (or dranyen), at Thimphu Press Club in 2023.

Background information
- Born: 1969 (age 56–57); Pemagatshel, Bhutan
- Genres: Zhungdra
- Occupation: Musician
- Instruments: Singing, dramyin, fipple, leaf whistle

Jigme Drukpa is a Bhutanese musician and singer of traditional folk songs, born in 1969 in the small village of Wongchelo, in Pemagatshel, eastern Bhutan. He graduated from Sherubtse College in 1993, and undertook postgraduate studies in Norway. He studied folk music at Rauland Academy and ethno music at Grieg Academy, and returned to Bhutan in 1999 as the country's first ethno-musicologist. He completed a master's degree in music therapy in Norway in 2017.

== Career ==
Drukpa produced the country's first mass release in 1989 on a Sony Walkman, individually recording 100 cassettes. In 1998 he became the first Bhutanese to digitally record music. Drukpa acted and performed in two Bhutanese films, Travellers & Magicians and Hema Hema: Sing Me a Song While I Wait, both made by Khyentse Norbu, aka Dzongsar Jamyang Khyentse Rinpoche. He appeared as himself in the documentary Bløf about a Dutch rock band giving a concert in Bhutan.

He has performed traditional folk music in over 200 cities, in about 34 countries, since 1993. He plays multiple instruments, including the dramyin, fipple flute and plant leaf whistle. He specializes in playing zhungdra, a complex style of Bhutanese folk music. In 2013 he was recognised as an "outstanding musician" and named Loden Entrepreneur of the Year.
