= Lingm =

Traditional Bhutanese flute instrument

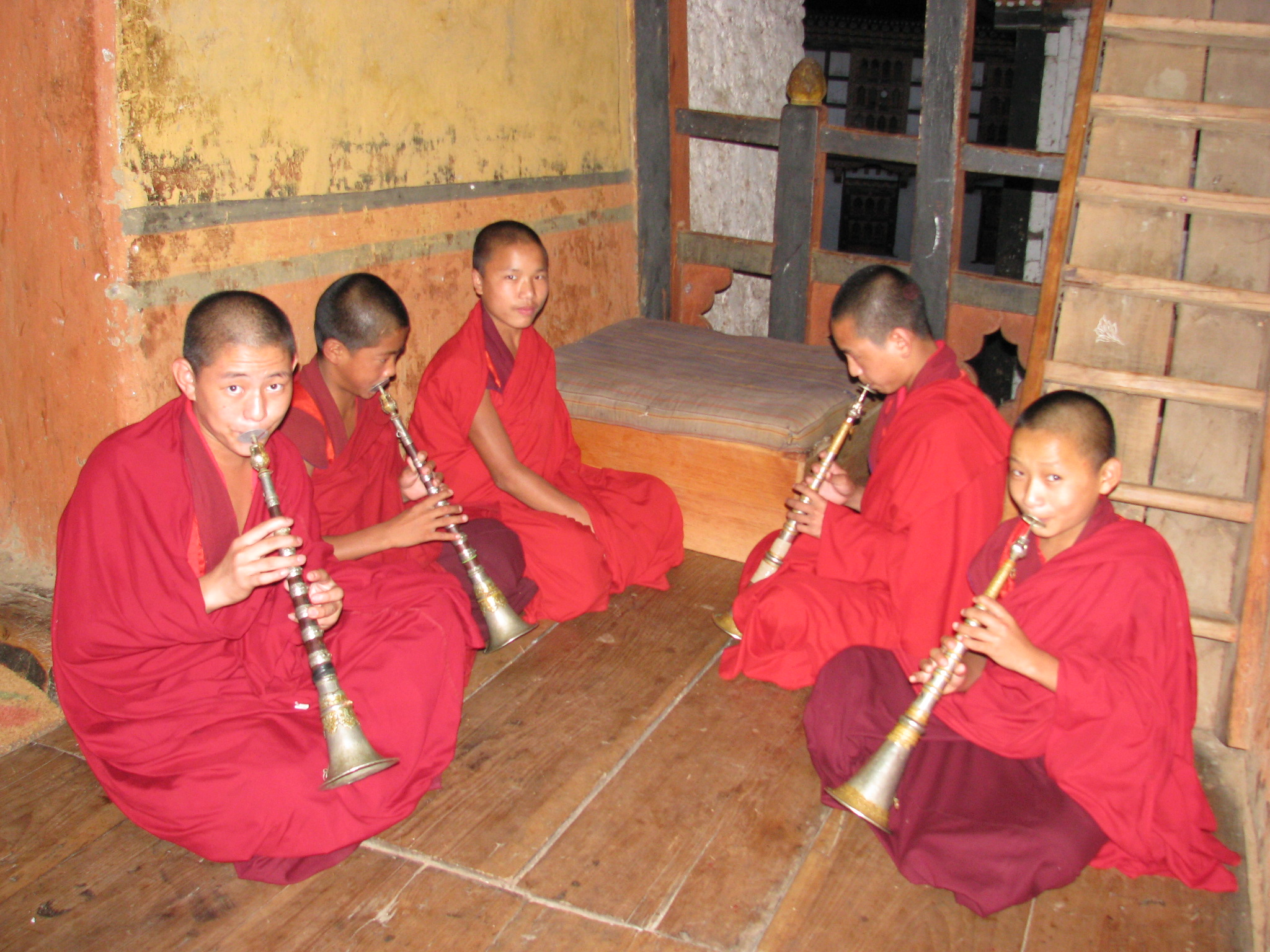
Monks playing lingm at Lhuentse Dzong

The lingm (Dzongkha: གླིངམ་, Wylie: glingm) is a bamboo flute indigenous to Bhutan. The lingm, the dramyin (lute) and the chiwang (fiddle) comprise the basic instrumental inventory for traditional Bhutanese folk music.

There are two varieties of lingm: the dong lingm (གདོང་གླིངམ་ Wylie: gdong-glingm), which is front-blown; and the zur lingm (ཟུར་གླིངམ་, Wylie: zur-glingm), which is side-blown.

== See also ==
- Music of Bhutan
- Gyaling
- Suona
