= Drayangs =

Entertainment bars in Bhutan

Drayangs were entertainment bars in Bhutan. They typically served alcoholic beverages, and had a stage on which entertainers danced and sang songs solicited from or requested by members of the audience. They also served traditional Bhutanese and Nepali cuisine. The songs are usually traditional Bhutanese music or from Bollywood. The majority of entertainers were women. In 2018, there were 49 drayangs in Bhutan, with 14 located in the capital Thimphu.

Drayang entertainers were usually paid a basic monthly salary, and were allowed to collect tips from the audience for requested songs. There was a range of opinions on drayangs in Bhutan. Critics of the venues described them as shady businesses exploitative of women. Drayang owners denied that they allowed abuse, and stated that drayangs generated employment for the entertainers, who would've otherwise been unemployed because of lack of opportunity and education.

== Ban ==
On 7 January 2022, the Bhutanese government decided to cease the operation of drayangs in the country through an executive order from the Prime Minister Lotay Tshering, stating: "It is time we acknowledge that our women working in drayangs are the most vulnerable. They are sexually objectified and disparaged in communities due to the nature of their job."

There were 60 drayangs in the country that have been closed since the onset of the pandemic in March 2020. Most former drayangs are now operating as bars due to the loss of their performers, which they were most known for. Drayangs had nearly 1000 employees, with around 15 in each one. Since the ban, there have been concerns among some Bhutanese people that the laid-off workers of the drayangs will join the sex work industry.
