= Zhungdra =

Bhutanese music genre

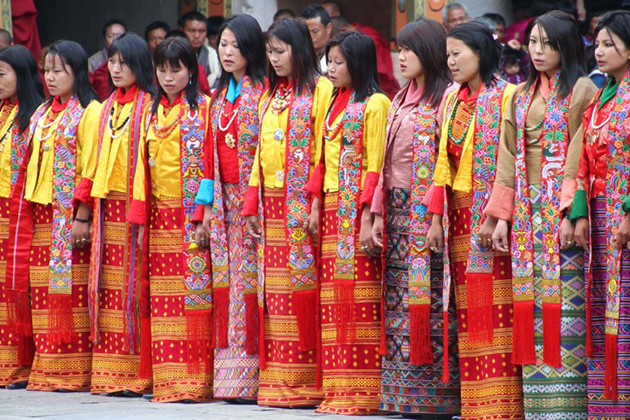
Women performing in 2024

Zhungdra (Dzongkha: གཞུང་སྒྲ་; Wylie: gzhung-sgra) is one of two main styles of traditional Bhutanese folk music, the other being bödra. Arising in the 17th century, zhungdra (zhung meaning "center, mainstream", and dra meaning "music") is an entirely endemic Bhutanese style associated with the folk music of the central valleys of Paro, Thimphu, and Punakha, the heart of the Ngalop cultural area. Bödra, in contrast, evolved out of Tibetan court music.

Zhungdra is characterized by the use of extended vocal tones in complex patterns which slowly decorate a relatively simple instrumental melody. Untrained singers, even those with natural singing ability, typically find it challenging to sing zhungdra. This has reduced the popularity of zhungdra compared with Rigsar, the fast-paced pop Bhutanese music style based on electronic synthesizers.

The Zhungdra style may be appreciated in songs such as Lhodrak Marpai Zhab, found on Jigme Drukpa's album Endless Songs from Bhutan.

Although formally secular, the lyrics of zhungdra songs often tell Buddhist allegories, such as Yak Legbi Lhadar, in which the singer tells of his former life as a yak slaughtered in connection with a non-Buddhist ritual in the Gasa district.

== See also ==
- Music of Bhutan
