= Rigsar =

Music genre of Bhutan

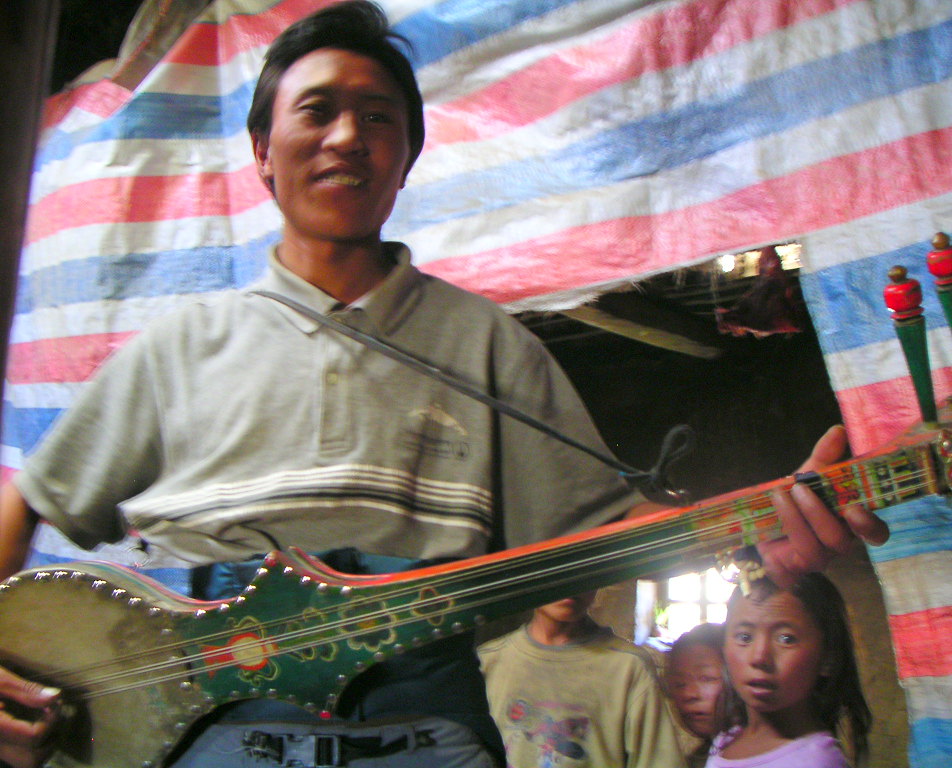
A Tibetan dranyen player.

Rigsar (Dzongkha རིག་གསར་; Wylie: rig-gsar; "new idea") is a music genre, the dominant type of popular music of Bhutan. It was originally played on a dranyen (a kind of string instrument), and dates back to the late 1960s. The first rigsar song, "Zhendi Migo" was a copy of the popular Bollywood filmi song "Sayonara" from the film Love in Tokyo. Rigsar songs can be in several languages, including the Tshangla (Sharchopkha) language.

The traditional dranyen, a kind of folk guitar, has been updated into the rigsar dranyen for use in popular music. The rigsar dranyen has 15 strings, two bridges and an extra set of tuning keys.

== History ==
Rigsar's popularity grew steadily in the 1970s, when the genre's modern form developed; Dasho Thinley, a schoolteacher and composer, performed a song called Dorozam which was very influential. Rigsar became very popular by 1981, when Shera Lhendup became a pop icon with the song Nga khatsa jo si lam kha lu; his 1986 Ngesem Ngesem was also very popular, and was the first to use keyboards. By the end of the 1980s rigsar was declining in popularity until the arrival of Norling Drayang, a very popular and prolific record label which has released more than 130 albums. Norling's breakthrough release was the album Pangi Shawa, which set the stage for future developments. In the early 1990s, the rigsar industry grew considerably as Drayang repopularized the genre, adding more electronic elements. Modern rigsar recordings often use electronic approximations of drums and guitars.

Suresh Moktan released an album, New Waves, in 1996 that is the highest-grossing Bhutanese album in sales. However, he has now begun criticizing rigsar as unmusical. Others dislike the genre because it is repetitive, simple and generally a copy of Indian popular songs, or because rigsar is not influenced by traditional Bhutanese music.

== See also ==
- Bödra
- Music of Bhutan
- Zhungdra
