= Dramyin Cham =

Dramyin Cham (Dzongkha: Dramnyen Cham) is a form of Cham dance, a masked and costumed dance performed in Tibetan Buddhism ceremonies in Bhutan, Sikkim, Himalayan West Bengal and Tibet (where they have been outlawed). They are a focal point of the Bhutanese festivals of Tsechu. The Dramyin Cham is notable among Cham dances as the lead dancer keeps time with a dramyin - a Himalayan folk music lute, and not a traditional percussion instrument like the cymbals. This is among the few instances of monastic music in the Himalayas where the use of a stringed instrument has been observed.

== Depicted themes ==
In the 13th century, monks from southern Tibet established the Drukpa Lineage of the Kagyu school of Vajrayana in Bhutan. This is celebrated in the Dramyin Cham as well as in the religious song "Dramyin Choeshay". Specifically, the dance celebrates an incident in Tibetan Buddhist mythology - the victory of the saint Tsangpa Gyare (1161-1211) over a demon which was obstructing a pilgrimage path to Tsari, Tibet at the mouth of a valley. The saint apparently subjugated the demon by performing a dramyin cham and it offered its services to him and became the guardian deity of the valley.

== Costumes ==
All participants in the Dramyin Cham are male, similar to the conventions pertaining to other Cham dances. The costumes of the dancers reflect the costume of armed lamas who acted as bodyguards to the Drukpa high lamas. The basic costume consists of elaborate, heavy, woolen clothes, a long, black Tibetan robe (chuba) lined with red, and long, colorful felt boots. Below the chuba, they typically wear a striped shirt with brocaded collars and cuffs of red, green and white. The leaders of the dance also wear a brown, folded jacket. One of the leaders carries the dramyin, with which he keeps time. All the dancers wear traditional armoury, weaponry, and ornaments.

== Accompaniment and choreography ==
The 17th century legislator Ngawang Namgyal, the Zhabdrung Rinpoche (1594 - 1651), under whom the Drukpa Lineage flourished, composed the lyrics and music for most of the present day Cham dances (including the Dramyin Cham), and authored the seminal work Gar-Thig-Yang Sum. The book indicates how most dances (including the Dramyin Cham) should be choreographed and rendered. With the exception of the introduction and the coda, the dance can and usually is performed in simple two-time. The dance includes symbolic references to stamping and subjugating the demon.
