= W.A.I.S.T. =

W.A.I.S.T. is the acronym for the West Africa Invitational Softball Tournament organized each January/February in Dakar by the local U.S. Embassy.

This amateur, co-ed slo-pitch softball tournament mainly attracts North American expatriates, Japanese, Australians, Canadians, and several expats as well. In recent years there has been increased participation by Senegalese nationals who currently account for three competitive teams. Participating teams have come from Senegal, The Gambia, Mauritania, Mali, Cape Verde, Niger, Guinea, and Burkina Faso, U.S. embassy personnel, students and faculty from local schools (including the International School of Dakar and Dakar Academy) make up the majority of the teams.

The majority of teams play in a non-competitive, social league. A competitive league also plays with teams represented from Senegal, the U.S., Canadian and Japan among others.

An offshoot event, W.A.I.S.T.D.C., began in 2008, and is held in mid-summer in Washington, D.C.
