= Boedra =

Bhutanese traditional music genre

Boedra (Dzongkha: བོད་སྒྲ་; Wylie: bod-sgra; "Tibetan music"; also spelled bödra) is a traditional genre of Bhutanese music. Boedra, which is influenced by Tibetan folk music, is one of the two main folk singing styles in Bhutan, the other being zhungdra, which was developed in the 17th century.

== See also ==
- Music of Bhutan
- Rigsar
