= Norling Drayang =

Norling Drayang is a music and film production company in the Kingdom of Bhutan.

Since its establishment in 1994, Norling Drayang has released more than 150 music albums and 5 feature films to date. With the release of "Jigdrel," Norling Drayang was recognized as the first production company ever to release a commercial feature film in Bhutan.

"Bhu Tashi", "Rangdol Yangdon" and "Tshey Ngoen Ley Thro" were then release. In 2014, Norling Drayang created the highest budget film ever titled "Choegyal Drimed Kuenden". It was reported on Kuensel, Bhutan's national newspaper, that a total sum of Ngultrums 18 million was invested in it.

The film "Choegyal Dhoenyoe Dhoendup" was expected to be released by December 2015.
