= Bumthang Valley =

Valley in Bhutan

Coordinates: 27.55°N 90.75°E

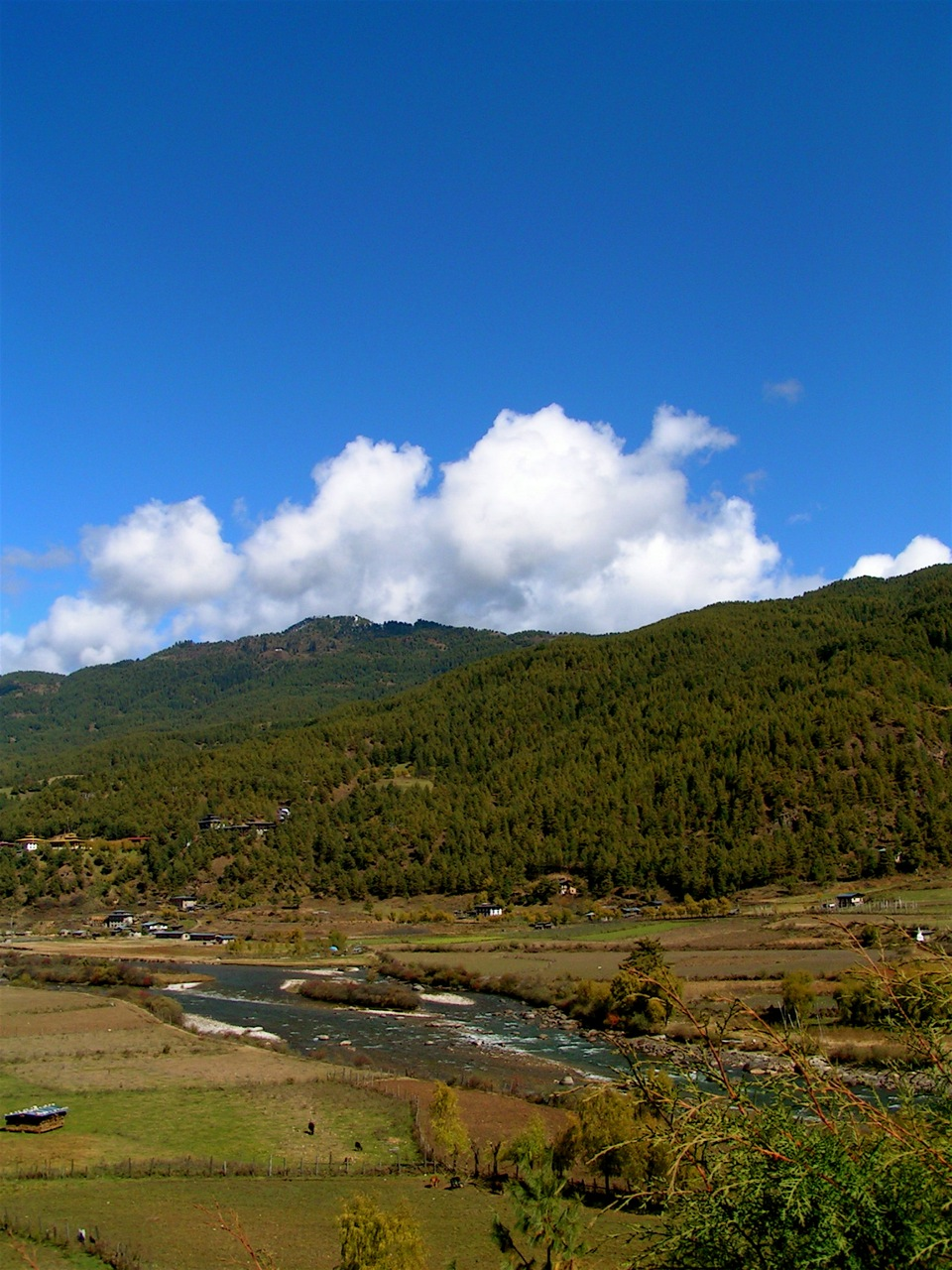
View of Bumthang Valley.

Bumthang Valley is the main inhabited valley in the Bumthang district of Bhutan.

== History ==
The Bumthang Valley is located in central Bhutan and is regarded as one of the country's most historically and spiritually significant regions. The main town in the valley is Jakar, which serves as the administrative and commercial centre of the district. Bhutan’s only brewery, which produces the *Red Panda* wheat beer, is also located in Jakar.

Bumthang District is administratively divided into four gewogs: Chhoekhor, Tang, Chhume and Ura.

The valley is broad and features a variety of habitats, including coniferous forests and alpine meadows. The local language, known as Bumthang language, belongs to the Tibeto-Burman family. Each of the four valleys in Bumthang has its own dialect.

== Jampa Lhakhang ==
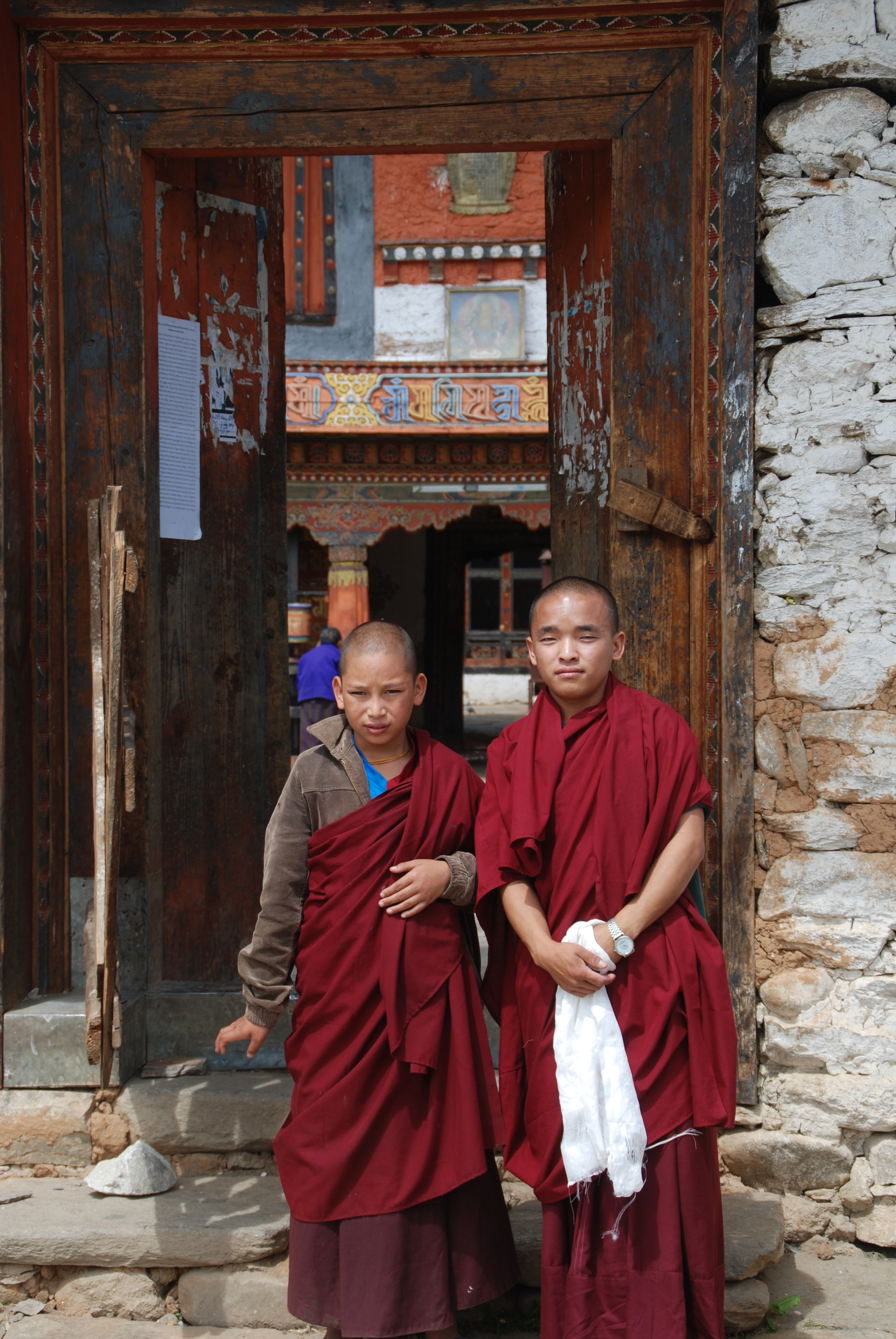
Jampa Lhakhang is the most important monastery in Bumthang

The Jampa Lhakhang temple is located in the heart of Jakar Valley, it was built in the early 7th century by the dharma king Songtsen Gempo.

He commissioned the creation of 108 temples at the same time to successive circles in order to pin down and evil demoness who was seen to be blocking the spread of Buddhism.

This monastery is one of two such temples that survive in Bhutan. the other being Kichu in Paro Dzongkhag. The Jampa Lhakhang is dedicated to Maitreya, the Buddha of the future.

Many historians assert Buddhism appeared in the establishment of this Jampa Lhakhang. This temple remains one of the most important landmarks of the country. The Jampa Lhakhang has never been destroyed by fire, flood, wind or earthquake.

Guru Rinpoche used Jampa Lhakhang as a residence when he visited Bumthang. Even today there is still a small room above the entrance of the main temple that people believe was the very first seat of Guru Rinpoche.

The Jampa Lhakhang festival has become an increasingly more popular tourist attraction due to two unique portions of the program in fire offering and Naked Dances.

== Pema Lingpa ==
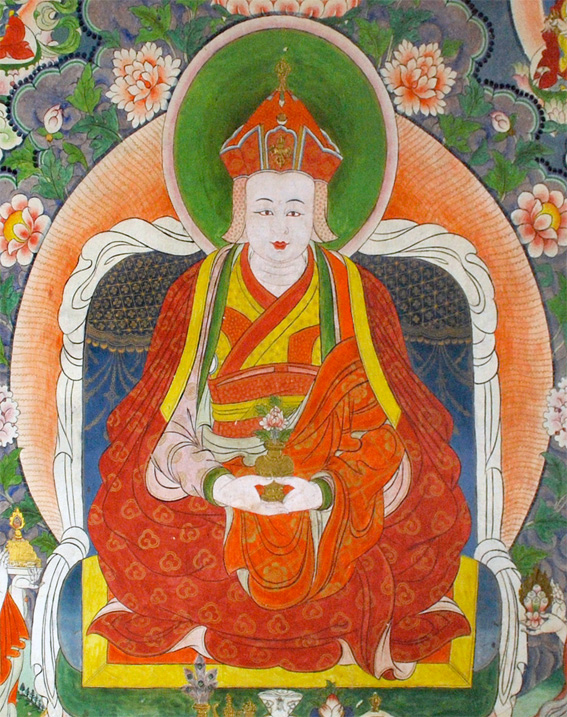

Pema Lingpa was born in Chel Baridrang in the Tang [Stang] valley in district of Bumthang. At the age of nine, the young Pema Lingpa began to apprentice as a blacksmith. It is said that he would often pretend to be seat on a throne, giving initiations and teachings, and performing ritual dance [cham]. Pema Lingpa was one of the five sovereign treasures of Guru Padmasambhava who hailed from Bumthang, Bhutanese people believed him to be a fully master who brought both cultural and spiritual reforms in Bhutan. He revealed numerous treasures such as scrolls, ritual objects, statues and so forth in accordance with the prophecy of Guru Padmasambhava for the benefit of all sentient beings. He was a great artist and a visionary lama who contributed to much positive changes with far reaching impact in Bhutanese history and culture. He was a preeminent Teron [discover of spiritual treasures] and is considered to be foremost of the five Terton Kings.in the history of the Nyingma school in Bhutan, Pema Lingpa is second in importance only to padmasambhava himself. He left several impressions of his feet on solid rocks in and around his birthplace, Chel Baridrang, below the Kunzang drag temple. One of Pema Lingpa's most renowned treasure discoveries took place in Bhutan at Mebartso [burning lake], where before a large crowd he leaped into deep water with a burning butter lamp in his hand, later emerging with a term in one hand and the still burning butter lamp in the other. His works are popular and have flourished in each and every corner of the Himalayas. Many of these hand -made treasures are on display at the National Museum of Bhutan in Paro.
