= Tshechu =

Bhutanese religious festival

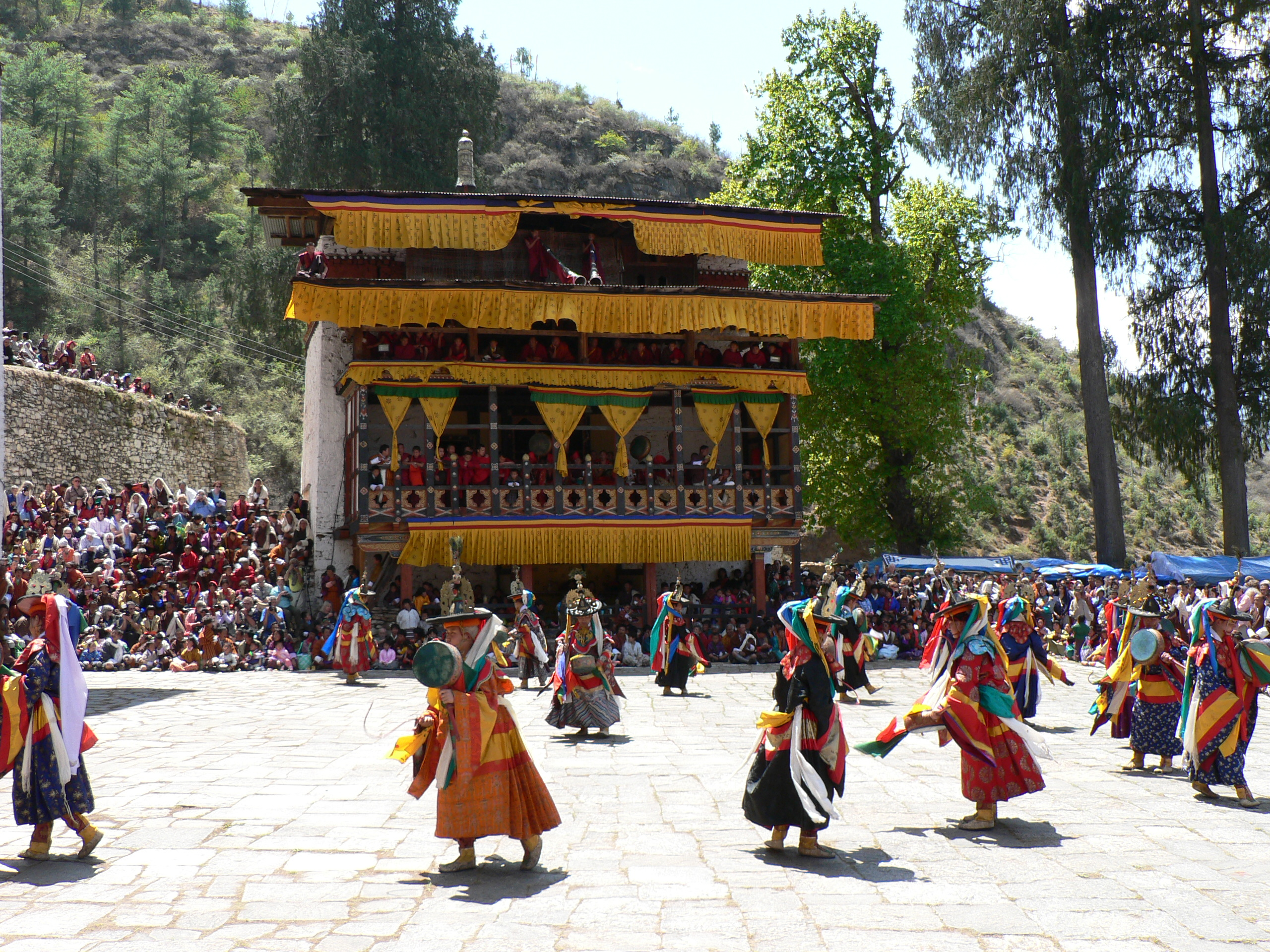
Dance of the Black Hats with Drums, Paro, April 2006

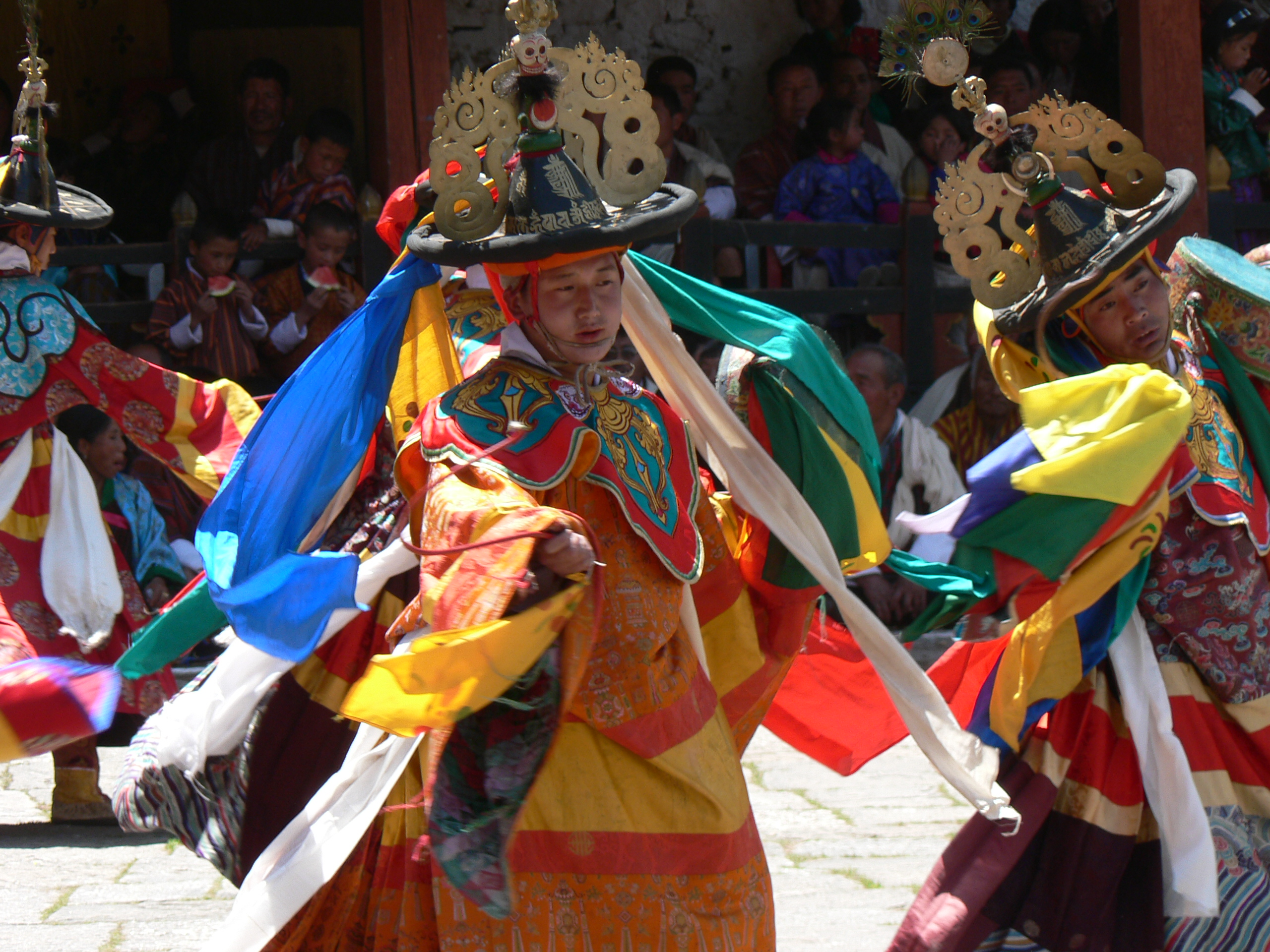
Dance of the Black Hats, Paro Tsechu festival of dances, 2006

A tshechu (Dzongkha: ཚེས་བཅུ།, literally "tenth day") is any of the annual religious Bhutanese festivals held in each district or dzongkhag of Bhutan on the tenth day of a month of the lunar Tibetan calendar. The month depends on the place. Tshechus are religious festivals of the Drukpa Lineage of the Kagyu school of Tibetan Buddhism.

Tshechus are large social gatherings, which perform the function of social bonding among people of remote and spread-out villages. Large markets also congregate at the fair locations, leading to brisk commerce. The Thimphu tshechu and the Paro tshechu are among the biggest of the tshechus in terms of participation and audience. They are related to traditions in other branches of Himalayan Buddhism, many of which have been banned in Tibet.

Several scenes from a tshechu in 2013

== Tshechu traditions ==
The focal point of the tshechus are Cham dances. These costumed, masked dances typically are moral vignettes, or based on incidents from the life of the 9th century Nyingma teacher Padmasambhava and other saints. Typically, monks perform unmasked in certain group dances, including the Black Hat dance, while laymen perform masked, in largely different plays. The monks are generally very precise in their movement, while some roles played by laymen involve considerable athleticism (such as the leaping dog shown below, who repeats this move over and over again). Groups of women perform songs, with limited dance movements, in between the plays.

Most tshechus also feature the unfurling of a thongdrel - a large appliqué thangka typically depicting a seated Padmasambhava surrounded by holy beings, the mere viewing of which is said to cleanse the viewer of sin. The thongdrel is raised before dawn and rolled down by morning.

Because tshechus depend on the availability of masked dancers, registered dancers are subject to fine if they refuse to perform during festivals.

== History of Tshechus ==
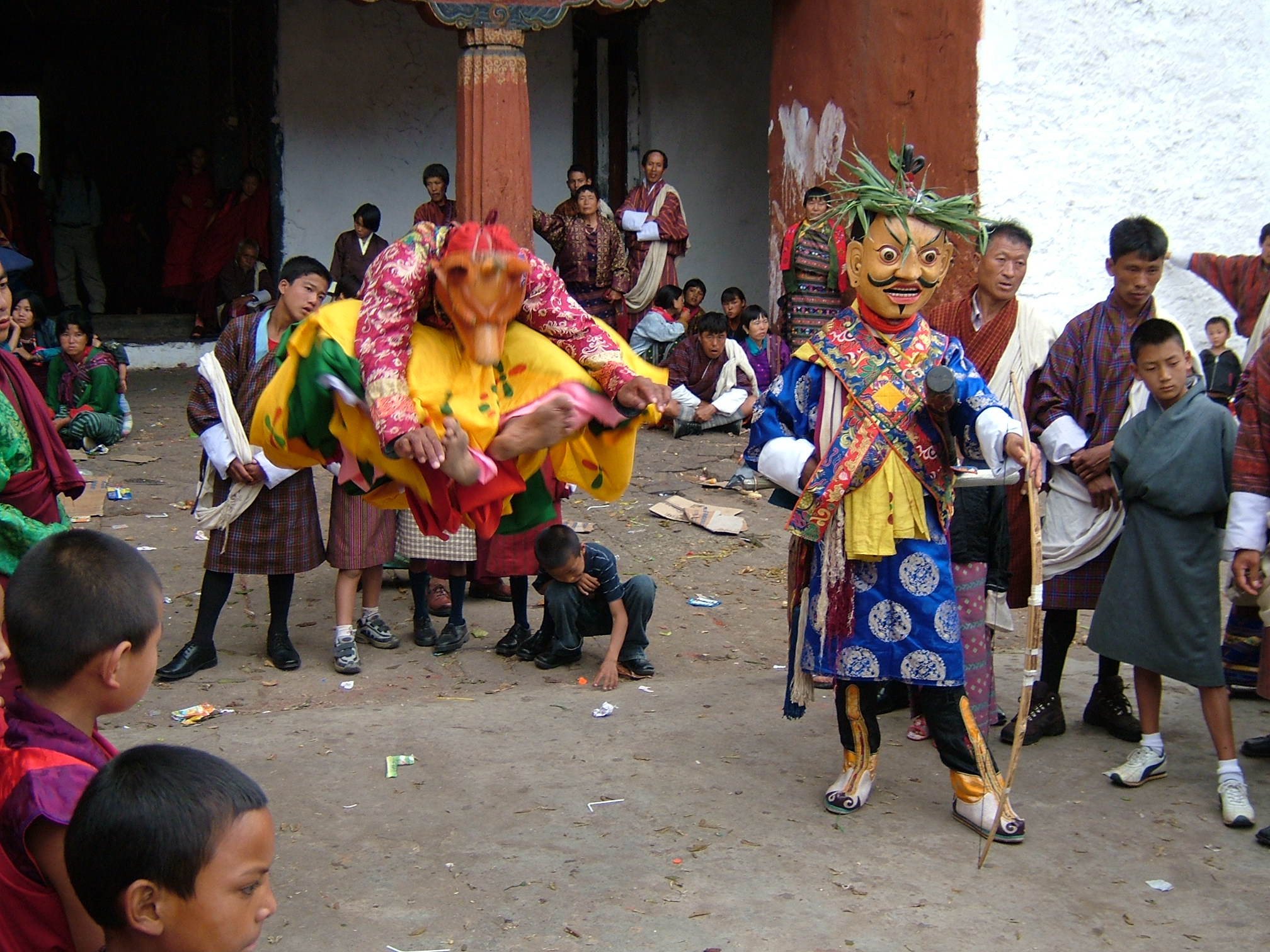
Masked dancers at the Wangdue Phodrang tshechu

Padmasambhava, the great scholar, visited Tibet and Bhutan in the 8th century and 9th century. He used to convert opponents of Buddhism by performing rites, reciting mantras and finally performing a dance of subjugation to conquer local spirits and gods. He visited Bhutan to aid the dying king Sindhu Raja. Padmasambhava performed a series of such dances in the Bumthang Valley to restore the health of the king. The grateful king helped spread Buddhism in Bhutan. Padmasambhava organized the first tshechu in Bumthang, where the eight manifestations of Padmasambhava were presented through eight forms of dances. These became the Cham dances depicting the glory of Padmasambhava.

Although the tradition began as a monastic practice, the first full public celebration took place in 1690 CE at Tashichho Dzong in Thimphu.

== Schedule ==
The dance schedule for each day of the four-day festival is set out and generally consists of the following dances.

- On the first day, the performances cover: Dance of the Four Stags (Sha Tsam); Dance of the Three kinds of Ging (Pelage Gingsum); Dance of the Heroes (Pacham), Dance of the Stags and Hounds (Shawo Shachi) and Dance with Guitar (Dranyeo Cham)
- On the second day the dances performed are: The Black Hat Dance (Shana), Dance of the 21 black hats with drums (Sha nga ngacham), Dance of the Noblemen and the Ladies (Pholeg Moleg), Dance of the Drums from Dramitse (Dramitse Ngacham), Dance of the Noblemen and the Ladies (Pholeg Moleg) and Dance of the Stag and Hounds (Shawa Shachi)
- On the third day, the dances performed are: Dance of the Lords of the Cremation Grounds (Durdag), Dance of the Terrifying Deities (Tungam) and Dance of the Rakshas and the Judgement of the Dead (Ragsha Mangcham)
- On the last day of the festival, the dances performed cover: Dance of Tamzhing Monastery in Jakar, Dance of the Lords of the Cremation grounds (the same dance as day 3), Dance of the Ging and Tsoling (Ging Dang Tsoling) and Dance of the Eight Manifestations of Padmasambhava (Guru Tshen Gye).

The last day of the four-day festival also marks the unfurling of the Thongdrel, a very large scroll painting or thangka, which is unfurled with intense religious fervour, early in the morning. This painting measuring 30 metres (98 ft)×45 metres (148 ft) has the images of Padmasambhava at the centre flanked by his two consorts and also his eight incarnations. Devotees who gather to witness this occasion offer obeisance in front of the Thongdrel seeking blessings. Folk dances are performed on the occasion. Before sunrise, the painting is rolled up and kept in the Dzong before it is displayed again one year later.

== List of tshechus ==
Below is a list of major tshechus in Bhutan, along with their 2011 dates. Dates in other years will vary.

Bhutan tshechu dates (2011)
Date	Tsechu	Location
January 2–04	Trongsa Tshechu	Trongsa
January 2–04	Lhuntse Tshechu	Lhuntse
January 2–04	Pemagatshel Tshechu	Pemagatshel
January 9	Shingkhar Metochodpa	Bumthang
January 9–13	Nabji Lhakhang Drup	Trongsa
February 10–15	Punakha Dromache & Tshechu	Punakha
February 17–21	Tangsibi Mani	Bumthang
February 18	Chorten Kora	Trashiyangtse
February 18	Tharpaling Thongdrol	Bumthang
February 19–21	Buli Mani Chumey	Bumthang
February–March (1st month, 7th day)	Trashiyangtse Tsechu	Trashiyangtse
March 4	Chorten Kora (2nd)	Trashiyangtse
March 13–15	Gomkora	Trashigang
March 13–15	Talo Tshechu	Talo, Punakha
March 13–16	Zhemgang Tshechu	Zhemgang
March 15–19	Paro Tshechu	Paro
March 17–19	Chhukha Tshechu	Chukha
October 16–25	Phuentsholing Tshechu	Phuentsholing
April 1–03	Gaden Chodpa	Ura, Bumthang
May 12–14	Domkhar Festival	Chhume, Bumthang
May 14–18	Ura Yakchoe	Ura, Bumthang
June 19–21	Padsel–Ling Kuchod	Bumthang
June	Laya Bumkhosa Festival (Bongkor)	Laya
July 8–10	Nimalung Tshechu	Bumthang
July 9–10 does not move	Alpine	Ha, Haa
July 10	Kurjey Tshechu	Bumthang
July 29	Gangte Kurim	Gangte, Wangdue Phodrang
October 1–05	Thimphu Drupchen	Thimphu
October 4–06	Wangdue Tshechu	Wangdue Phodrang
October 4–06	Gangte Drubchen & Tshechu	Gangte, Wangdue Phodrang
October 6–08	Tamshingphala Choepa	Bumthang
October 6–08	Gasa Tshechu	District Gasa
October 6–08	Thimphu Tshechu	Thimphu
October 10–12	Thangbi Mani	Bumthang
November 1–05	Shingkhar Rabney	Ura, Bumthang
November 3–06	Jakar Tshechu	Jakar, Bumthang
November 10–14	Jambay Lakhang Drup	Bumthang
November 11–13	Prakhar Duchoed	Bumthang
November 12 does not move	Black Necked Crane Festival	Gangte, Wangdue Phodrang
November 22–25	Sumdrang Kangsol	Ura, Bumthang
December 2–05	Trashigang Tshechu	Trashigang
December 2–05	Mongar Tshechu	Mongar
December 3–04	Tang Namkha Rabney Tang	Bumthang
December 10	Singye Cham, Jambay Lhakhang	Bumthang
December 10–12	Nalakhar Tshechu	Bumthang
December 10–13	Chojam Rabney Tang	Bumthang

== In popular culture ==
The Bhutanese film Travellers and Magicians is set among a group of travellers, most of whom are going to the Thimphu tshechu.

== See also ==
- List of Buddhist festivals
- Sho Dun Festival, similar festival in Tibet, western China
- Poya, similar concept in Sri Lanka however revolves around the cycle of the full moon of the lunar calendar
