= Lhodrak Karchu Monastery (Bumthang) =

Buddhist monastery in Bhutan

Lhodrak Kharchu Monastery
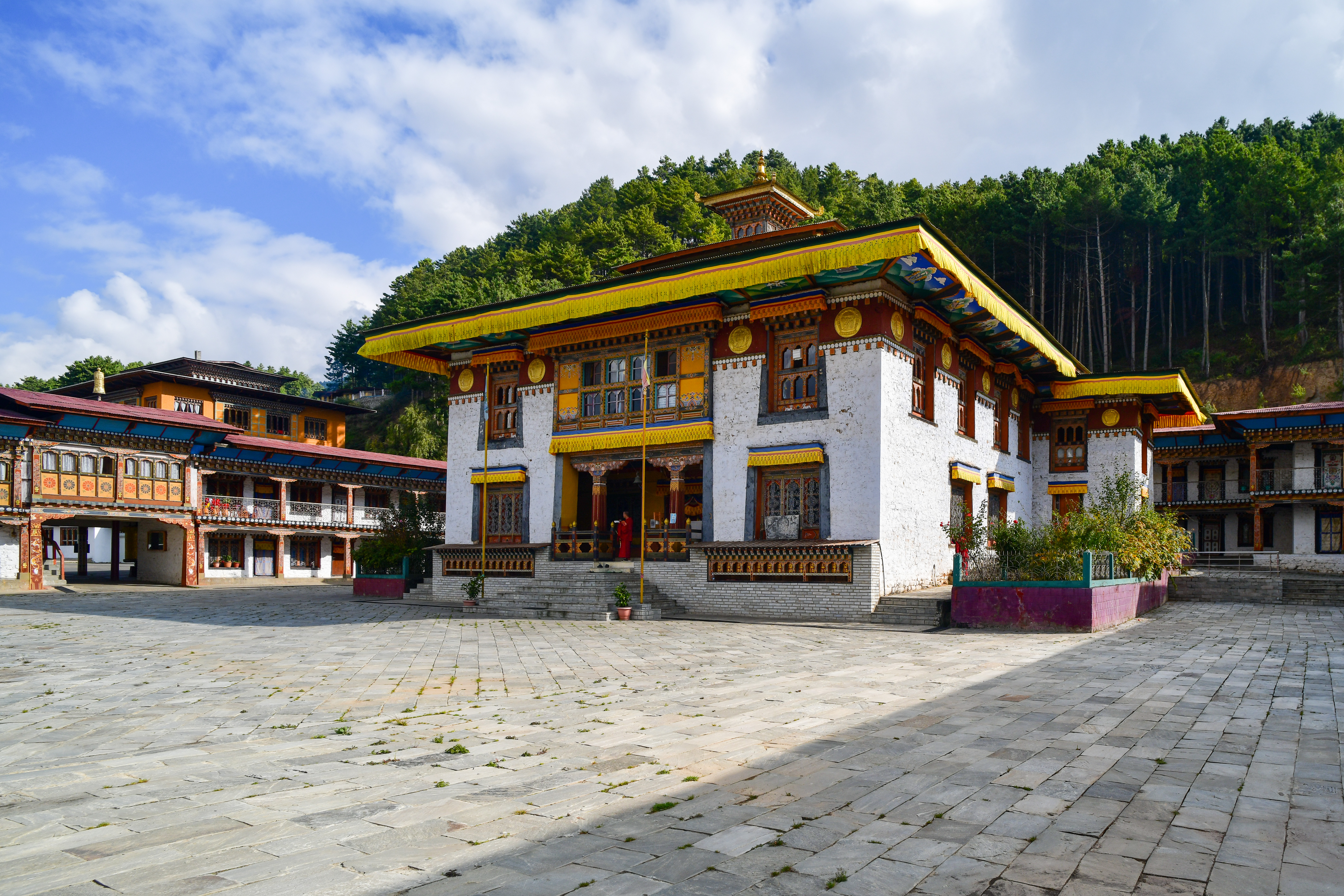

- Location within Bhutan

Religion
- Affiliation: Tibetan Buddhism
- Sect: Nyingma (rNying Ma)
- Festival: Telda Tshechu every four years (spTral zlDa Tshe bChu)
- Leadership: Namkhai Nyingpo Rinpoche VII, Jamyang Yeshey Tenpai Gyaltshan Pal Zangpo ('Jam dByang Ye Shes bStan Pai rGyal mTshan dPal bZang Po)

Location
- Location: Bumthang District, Bhutan
- Country: Bhutan
- Coordinates: 27°35′03″N 90°45′33″E

Architecture
- Style: Dzong
- Founder: Namkhai Nyingpo Rinpoche VII
- Established: 1994
- The monastery is currently undergoing construction every year trying to keep up pace with the outside world.

Lhodrak Kharchu Monastery is a Buddhist Nyingmapa Monastery of Jangter Tradition based in Bumthang District Central Bhutan. The monastery overlooks Jakar Dzong and the valley of Jakar town.

The monastery was built in the 1980s in the traditional Dzong architectural style following a huge support by the gracious Fourth King of Bhutan, Jigme Singye Wangchuk and funding from International and Bhutanese patrons as well. As of 2006 the monastery was still not entirely completed. Nevertheless the monastery is home to more than 250 monks, many of them being children and young adults.
