= Tang Rimochen Lhakhang =

Buddhist monastery in Bumthang, Bhutan

Ta Rimochan
- Location within Bhutan

Religion
- Affiliation: Tibetan Buddhism
- Sect: Nyingma

Location
- Location: Bhutan
- Country: Bhutan
- Interactive map of Ta Rimochan
- Coordinates: 27°34′1″N 90°50′1″E

Architecture
- Founder: Pema Lingpa
- Established: 14th century

Ta Rimochan or Ti Rimochen (Dzongkha; Tibetan: སྟག་རི་མོ་ཅན, Wylie: taak ri mo chan, Standard Tibetan Tang Rimochen) is a Buddhist monastery in Bhutan belonging to the Nyingma school of Tibetan Buddhism.

It is located near the village of Misethang in the Tang Valley east of Jakar. A stupa gate marks the road leading to it. Tang Rimochen Lhakhang is located four kilometers from the base of the Kunzangdrak monastery.

== History ==
According to legend, Padmasambhava meditated on a giant rock, and together with his two consorts Mandarava and Yeshe Tsogyal, left footprints here. The name of the temple is associated with tiger stripes, which can be seen on the rock.

There are two large rocks below the temple which are stated to "represent male and female jachung" or garudas. The location of a pond Padmasambhava used for ablutions is also marked. The cremation grounds are located near a "two legged khonying" or "two-legged archway chorten". is about 200 metres (660 ft) away from the temple.

The temple itself was founded by Pema Lingpa in the 14th century, right under the cliff. This establishment had been earlier predicted by religious master Longchenpa, who had seen it in a vision. In the 19th century the temple was restored by a distant descendant of Dorje Lingpa himself, Penlop Dorje Tsoke of Trongsa District. In the temple, there is a valuable painting of Milarepa.

Further up the valley is Ogyen Choeling Monastery, which is about 45 minutes away by foot. It is located north of the Rimochen monastery on the hill top, surrounded by hamlets.

== Geography ==
The Tang Rimochen Lakhang is located in the Tang Valley on the west bank of the Tang Chuu river, famous for trout fish. The rock wall behind this temple rises vertically and it has attained fame due to the historical link with the Guru Rimpoche and Pema Lingpa (known as the Terton or the treasure finder). The rock face is covered with beehives which are collected by the local people with ropes. The monastery is at a distance of 4 kilometres (2.5 mi) from the base of the Kunzandra cliff. A school and the Misethang village are located close to the monastery.

The road from Bumthang or Jakar to the Rimochen Lhakhang passing through rugged terrain has many historical monuments of great religious significance, starting with the visit of Padmasambhava to the area or the location. Initially, after crossing a bridge across the Bumtang Chuu, the road goes down to Dechen Pelrithang (a sheep rearing farm, at an elevation of 2,800 metres (9,200 ft)), then passes the famous Mebartsho gorge (the place in which treasure was found by Rimpoche in the river at deep depths under severe visibility constraints diving down with a lighted butter lamp, and hence named as the "Blazing Fire Lake") of the Tang valley. It then climbs steeply and reaches the Kungzandra Monastery, a site originally visited by Padmasambhava in the 8th century and later became a monastery 1488 under Pema Lingpa, and three more temples (Wangkhang, Ozerphuk and Khandroma Lhakhang) before reaching the Rimochen Monastery, named after Padmasambava's markings on a large rock.

== Markings ==
The first foundation for the Lhakhang was laid by Guru Rimpoche. Subsequently, the Terton Pema Lingpa also added images and texts he found to the temple. The monastery is noted for its rock markings. Tiger stripes visible on the rocks give their name to the temple. To the rear side of the temple, on the rock face, there are foot prints of the 8-year-old daughter of Thisongdetsen (the King of Tibet in the 8th century) who is called the "Lotus Princess." It is said that the girl came on a pilgrimage to the site along with Guru Rimpoche. She died here and the rock face is stated to contain her body with a mystic treasure named as "The mystic keys to the future" (as a gift for future generations). A door impression visible on this is inferred to be the mystic keys to the hidden treasures. Imprints of Guru Rinpoche and his favourite consort, Yeshey Tsogyal in an embrace is also seen on the rock.

== Legends ==
Several legends have been narrated to the treasure hunts that Pema Lungpa embarked on during his left time in Bhutan, some of which had very serious and adverse consequences in the past. Even the treasure image of Buddha that Lungpa had extracted in 1504 from Rimochen monastery had caused him bad luck which was only cured after he performed religious rites for 18 days.

Earlier to this incident, in the late 13th and early 14th century, a text discoverer, known as Sherab Membar, under the orders of his superior had taken out the text of the rGyud-bu-chung (“Little Son Tantra”) meaning a “Cycle belonging to the Teachings of Great Fulfilment” which was contained in a box buried under the crevice of a rock infested with a snake. As he was not the rightful owner, his master who had ordered the Treasure Hunt was murdered by people of the Chokor valley of Bumthang, three days after the treasure text was found. However, Sherab Membar copied the text, then returned it to its original secret hiding place in Rimochen but he died soon after he took it to a place called Bel in western Bhutan, subjected to psychic disturbances. His son also underwent a similar experience and before he could return the transcript to Rimochen he also died. On his death bed he directed that the transcript should go to a Lama by the name Khamchung, who in turn passed it on to another Lama called Ozer. Ozer then brought it to Pema Lungpa, since he was also affected by magical disturbances, and he was unable to read them. Finally, Lungpa verified the transcribed text with the original text concealed in Rimochen Monastery. He was fully qualified to do so, as he was considered the incarnation of Longchenpa to do the translation and transmit the meaning of the text to his disciples.
