= Lamay Monastery =

Monastery in Bumthang, Bhutan

- Location within Bhutan

Religion
- Affiliation: Tibetan Buddhism

Location
- Location: Bumtang, Bhutan
- Country: Bhutan
- Interactive map of Lamay Monastery
- Coordinates: 27°32′44″N 90°43′30″E

Lamay Monastery or Lamay Gonpa is a Buddhist monastery in Bumthang, Bhutan. It is located four kilometers (two and a half miles) above the Jakar Dzong and was built by the Trongsa Penlop, Sonam Drugel, the great-grandfather of King Ugyen Wangchuck in the 19th century. Wangchuck restored the building and it was used as the residence of his two daughters. The palace's main tower was destroyed due to structural problems. Today the building houses the Forestry Institute.
