= Sobrang Monastery =

Sumtrhang Monastery
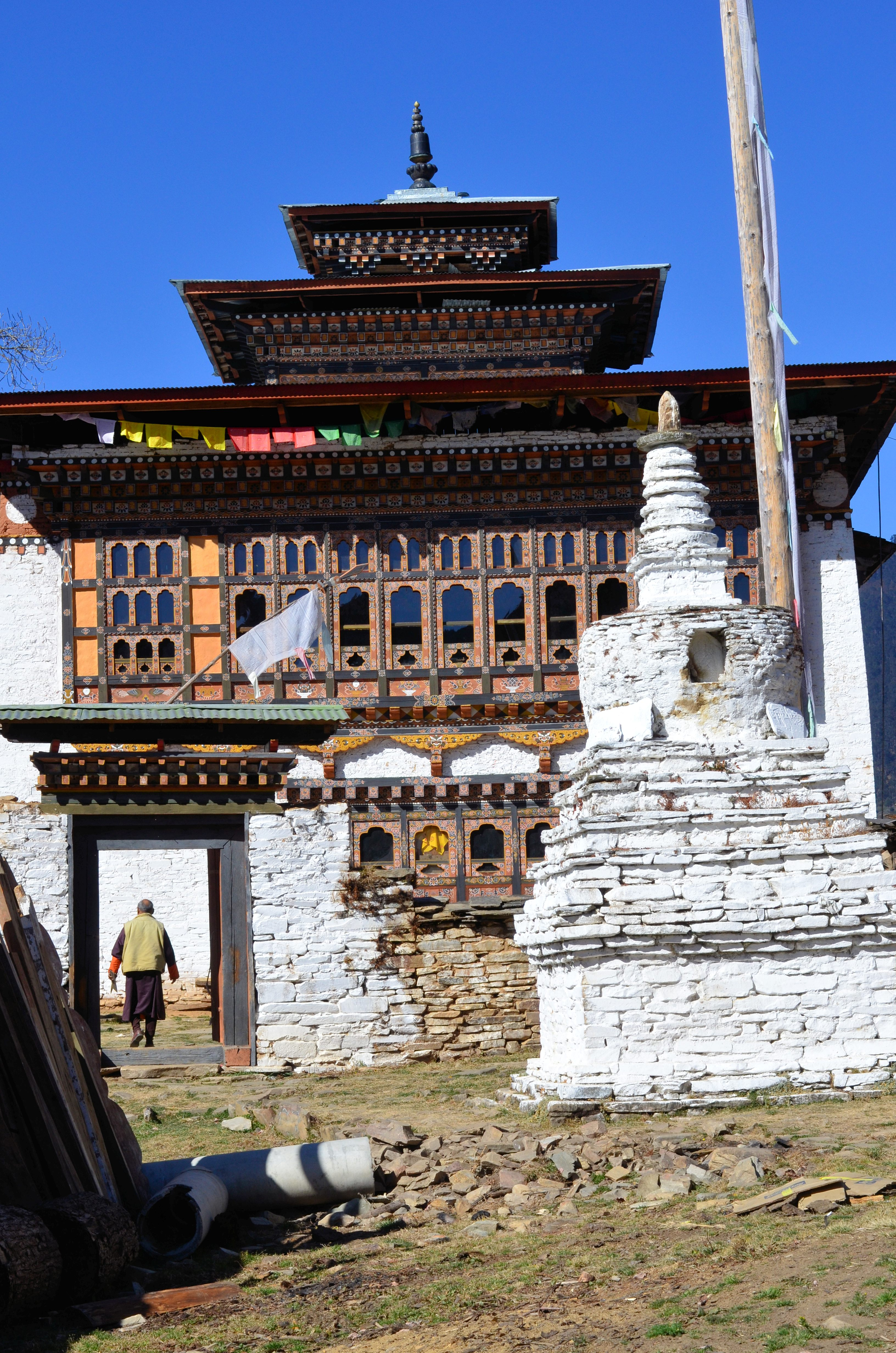
- Sumtrhang Monastery

- Location within Bhutan

Religion
- Affiliation: Tibetan Buddhism
- Festival: Kangsol
- Leadership: Choje Wangdrag Jamtsho

Location
- Location: Bhutan
- Country: Bhutan
- Interactive map of Sumtrhang Monastery
- Coordinates: 27°29′32.25″N 90°55′7.32″E

Architecture
- Founder: Gyelwa Lhanangpa (1164-1224) or Nyoetoen Trushig Choje (1179-1265)
- Established: 1230; 796 years ago

Sumthrang Lhakhang is located in the Ura Gewog, Bumthang district in central Bhutan. It is one of the earliest religious establishments in central Bhutan and probably the first center for the practice of Vajrakilaya teachings in Bhutan. It was founded around 1200 CE by practitioner of Vajrakilaya teachings from the Nyö Clan called Nyöton Thrulzhik Chöjé (approx. 1179-1265). Nyöton was a scion of the Nyö lineage in the 18th generation and is the son of Nyö Gyelwa Lhanangpa Sangay Raychen alis Zejid Pel (1164-1224). However, according to the oral history, it is established by Gyelwa Lhanangpa. Nevertheless, since its establishment, the temple has been a vibrant center of religious and cultural life and served as a source of religious culture and traditions for most of the central and some parts of eastern Bhutan. Sumthrang, thus, is a very important religious, cultural and historical center in Bhutan's history.In addition, descendants from its lineage include Pema Lingpa and hence the Wangchuck Royal family. As one of the earliest religious centers in the country, it houses some of Bhutan's oldest and most sacred relics.

The Founder, Nyöton Thrulzhik Chöjé was born to Gyelwa Lhanangpa of Nyö lineage and mother Lhacik Dechokma. He was born on the 15th day of the fourth lunar month of the Earth Pig Year. It is described in his biography about his prophetic journey from Tibet to the South (present day Bhutan, particularly, Ura) and the foundation of the temple. After identifying the four important landmarks in four directions with a stone pillar at the center of those landmarks, as prophesied for his temple establishment, he founded Sumthrang Samdrup Chödzong, now popularly known as the Sumthrang Lhakhang in the beginning of the 13th century. The surrounding village the Sumthrang gradually developed around the temple.

It was restored in the early 20th century and again in 2000.

== Lineage holder ==
The lineage holder is called the Sumtrhang Choeje.

== Festivals ==
The Sumtrhang Choeje's family perform the Kangsoel ritual each year in the 9th or 10 Bhutanese month. This involves religious dances and provides a purification and blessing for the family and the community.

== Relics ==
These include:

- Three stone pillars, two in the courtyard and one inside the building. They are solid megaliths lacking inscriptions and dating to prehistoric times.
- Several thick bamboos resembling vajra, believed to have been given by Gyelwa Lhanangpa to his son after opening sacred sites at Tsari Mountain.
- A small drum called "the roar of the thunder"; the sound of which gave the monastery its name.
- A statue of the founder, Nyoetoen Thrulzhig Choeje.
