= Lhodrak Seykhar Dratshang =

Buddhist monastic school in Bumthang, Bhutan

Seykhar Monastery
- Location within Bhutan

Religion
- Affiliation: Tibetan Buddhism

Location
- Location: Bhutan
- Country: Bhutan
- Interactive map of Seykhar Monastery
- Coordinates: 27°33′33.33″N 90°34′38.79″E

Architecture
- Established: founded by Lhodrack sey community in 1963, same guardian of Seykhar Dratsang in Tibet

Lhodrak Seykhar Dratshang (also Sekargutho Monastery or Sey Lhakhang) is a Buddhist monastic school in Bumthang (Bhutan) near Jakar city. The name means nine story of Son. The school was established in 1963, dedicated to Marpa Lotsawa.
