= Lhedang =

- Location in Bhutan
- Coordinates: 27°55′N 90°45′E
- Country: Bhutan
- District: Bumthang District
- Time zone: UTC+6 (BTT)

Lhedang is a town in Bumthang District in the north-eastern region of Bhutan.
