= Ura, Bhutan =

Ura
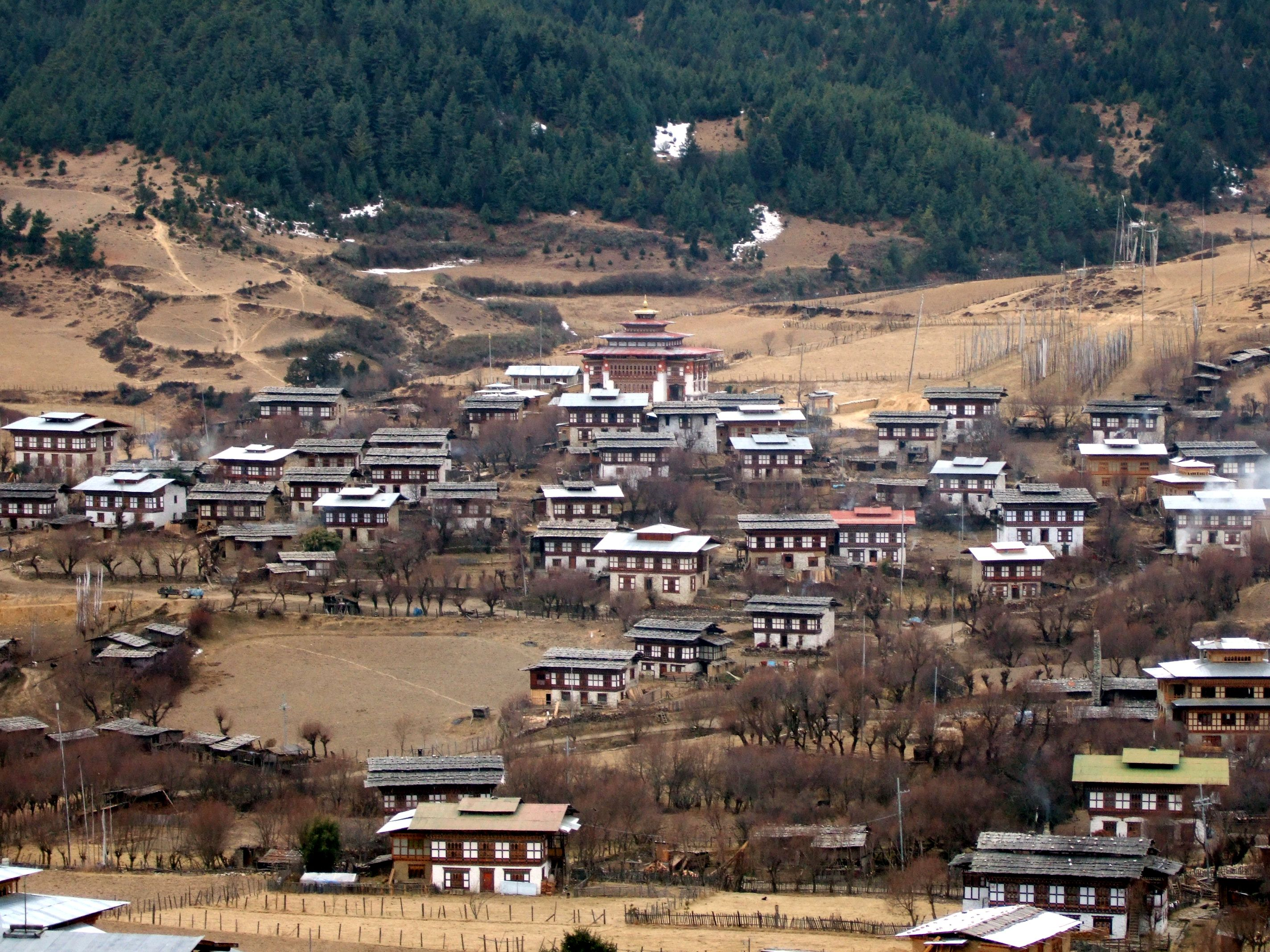
- Ura Makrong village, Bhutan

- Location in Bhutan
- Coordinates: 27°28′39″N 90°54′17″E
- Country: Bhutan
- District: Bumthang District
- Village block: Ura Gewog
- Time zone: UTC+6 (BTT)

Ura is a town in Ura Gewog in Bumthang District in northeastern Bhutan.

== Matsutake Festival ==
The town is famous for the Matsutake Festival that is organized every August. The festival celebrates the mushroom season.

== Cultural references ==
The town was featured as a primary site in Pawo Choyning Dorji's 2023 film The Monk and the Gun.
