= Dhur =

Dhur དུར་
- Location in Bhutan
- Coordinates: 27°36′N 90°39′E
- Country: Bhutan
- Dzongkhag: Bumthang District
- Gewog: Chhoekhor Gewog
- Time zone: UTC+6 (BTT)

Dhur or D°ur (Dzongkha: དུར་; Wylie: dur) is a town in western Chhoekhor Gewog, Bumthang District in central Bhutan.

Dhur is the main area where Brokkat, one of the endangered languages of Bhutan, is spoken.
