= Tang Gewog =

Tang Gewog སྟང་རྒེད་འོག
- Gewog
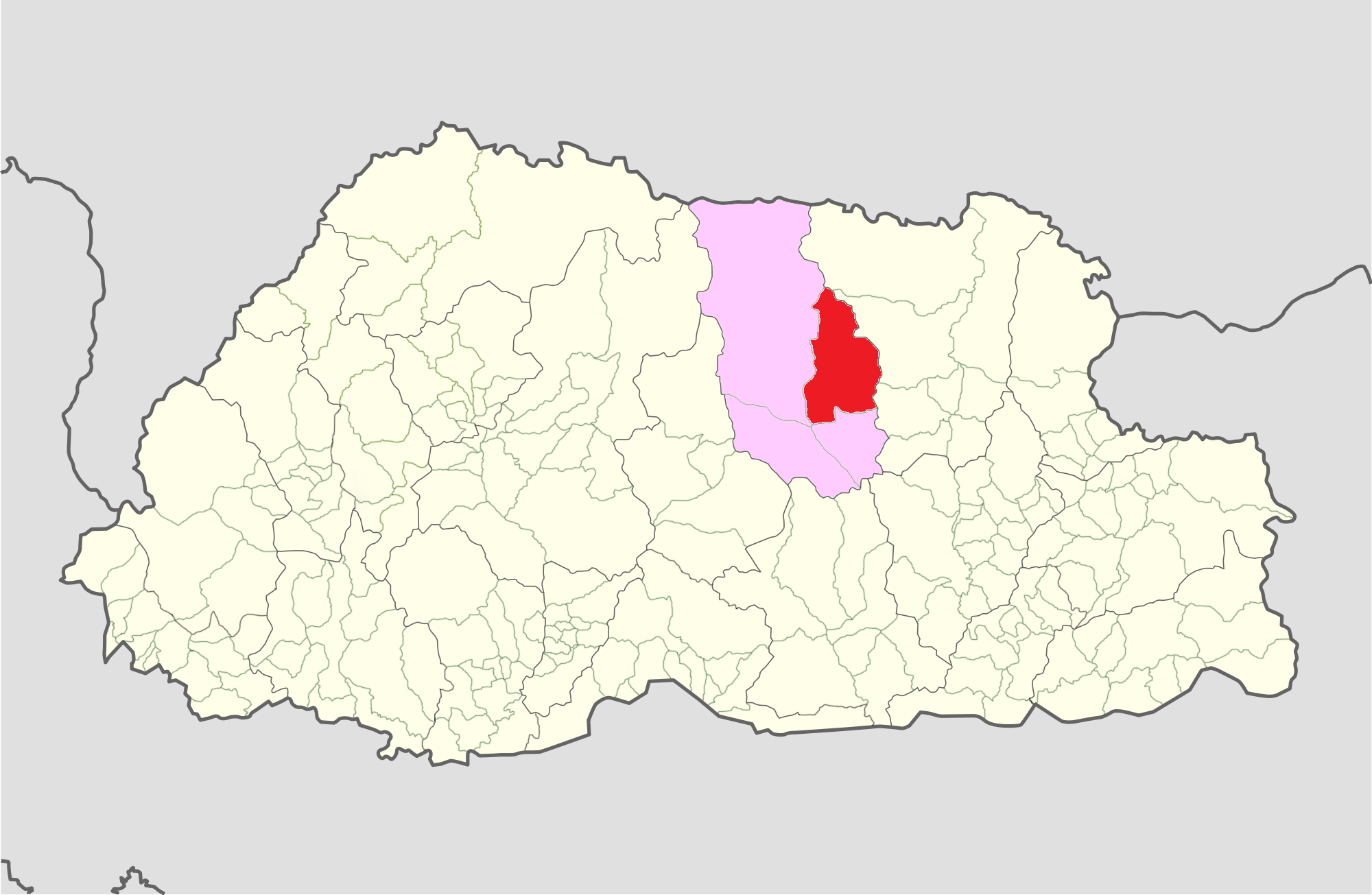
- Location of Tang Gewog within Bumthang
- Coordinates: 27°33′29″N 90°48′16″E
- Country: Bhutan
- District: Bumthang District

Area
  - Total: 511 km^{2} (197 sq mi)

Population
  - Total: 1,816
  - Density: 3.55/km^{2} (9.20/sq mi)
- Time zone: UTC+6 (BTT)

Tang Gewog (Dzongkha: སྟང་རྒེད་འོག) is a gewog (village block) of Bumthang District, Bhutan.

== See also ==
- Chhoekhor
