= Tamzhing Monastery =

Tibetan Buddhist monastery in Bumthang District, Bhutan

Coordinates: 27°35′16″N 90°44′16″E

- Tamzhing Lhündrup Monastery in Bumthang District.

Religion
- Affiliation: Tibetan Buddhism
- Sect: Nyingma

Location
- Location: Bumthang District, Bhutan
- Interactive map of Tamzhing Monastery

Architecture
- Style: Gompa
- Founder: Pema Lingpa
- Established: 1501; 525 years ago
- Completed: 1501; 525 years ago

Tamzhing Lhündrup Monastery (Wylie: gtam zhing lhun grub chos gling) in Bumthang District in central Bhutan is a Nyingma gompa in Bhutan. Its temple and monastery are remarkable for their direct connection to the Bhutanese tertön and saint, Pema Lingpa (1450-1521) and his tulkus. It is now the seat of Sungtrul Rinpoche, the current speech incarnation of Pema Lingpa.

Tamzhing consists of a deteriorating temple and a cramped vihara. It supports a body of over 95 Buddhist monks. In March 2012, the monastery was submitted for inscription on the list of World Heritage Sites; it currently resides on the tentative list.

Tamzhing Monastery is renowned for the Tamzhing Phala Choepa Festival.

== History ==
The temple was built by Pema Lingpa in 1501; the coeval wall paintings include his portrait and are amongst the earliest in the country.

Before 1960 Tamshing was a privately owned temple (like many other temples in Bhutan). After Pema Lingpa died in the temple at the age of seventy-two in 1521, his descendants took over care of the temple. Gradually, over many years, Tamshing fell into a state of disrepair and neglect. The temple courtyard was used as a granary and local people came less and less, except for special days.

In 1959, when many Tibetans (including the present Dalai Lama) fled their country for fear of being killed quite a few came to the Bumthang region, which is the cradle of Buddhism in Bhutan.

In his time, Pema Lingpa received a vision to travel to Tibet where he revealed a treasure hidden by Guru Rinpoche (Padmasambhava) many centuries before. He was given land in the Longti area of the Siti valley and built a temple there which is called Lhalung. This temple was later enlarged by his third (Tibetan) incarnation. Pema Lingpa travelled frequently to Tibet and most of his incarnations were Tibetan.

The 10th incarnation of Pema Lingpa died in Tibet shortly before the Tibetan diaspora. In 1960, a group of three monks from Lhalung monk body headed by Lhalung's second in command, Thinley Kuenchap (d. 1975) came to Tamshing to reestablish the Lhalung monk body at Tamshing.

Lopen Thinley Kuenchap was well known to the exiled Tibetan monks in Bhutan. Hearing of his arrival at Tamshing, many gathered there in late 1960 and established the current monk body. Over time, this group has grown from 10 or 15 monks to over 95.

When the Khudun, Lopen Kharma, came to Tamshing as a young boy in 1980, most of the senior monks from Tibet had passed on, however, Lopen Tseten who came from Tibet to Tamshing as a 10-year-old monk in 1960 was still there. Today, Lopen Tseten is the head of the monastery organization and its senior teacher.

The present spiritual head of Tamshing is the 11th incarnation of Pema Lingpa, the Lama Sungtrul Rinpoche (speech incarnation) he was born in the Chumi Valley of Bumthang, Bhutan in 1967.

== Tamshing today ==
The core missions of Tamshing are teaching the Dharma, performing religious services for the community and educating the young monks under its care. Since Tamshing is not government supported it faces increasing challenges posed by supporting 95 monks while maintaining the ancient physical structures.

Mostly under the age of 15, the monks are either orphans or from very poor families who can't afford to send their children to a state school. As the economy of the country changes, and as the culture becomes more outward looking, it is inevitable that some of the old ways of supporting the temples and monasteries, (which are the repositories of traditional wisdom), are being tested.

Tamshing has no endowment; no mission to make money, its only mission is to meet the needs of the community. Currently, the monastery runs at a loss.

Butter lamps are lit in front of the wall paintings for devotional purposes, which causes some damage.

== Tamshing and Bhutanese Dance ==
Tamshing is the original home of sacred dances that are celebrated at traditional Tsechus (festivals) throughout Bhutan. According to Joseph Houseal, director of Core of Culture Dance Preservation:

"Dance...is the living tradition of their founding identity and the means by which Pema Lingpa sought to teach the world Buddhism - and the treasure he specifically left the Tamshing monks. It is the life of the order, the Buddhist truth they maintain. That is one reason we have focused on Tamshing: their dances were revealed by the most famous Bhutanese saint, and Tamshing alone performs the dances correctly..."

== Gallery ==
Tamzhing Monastery

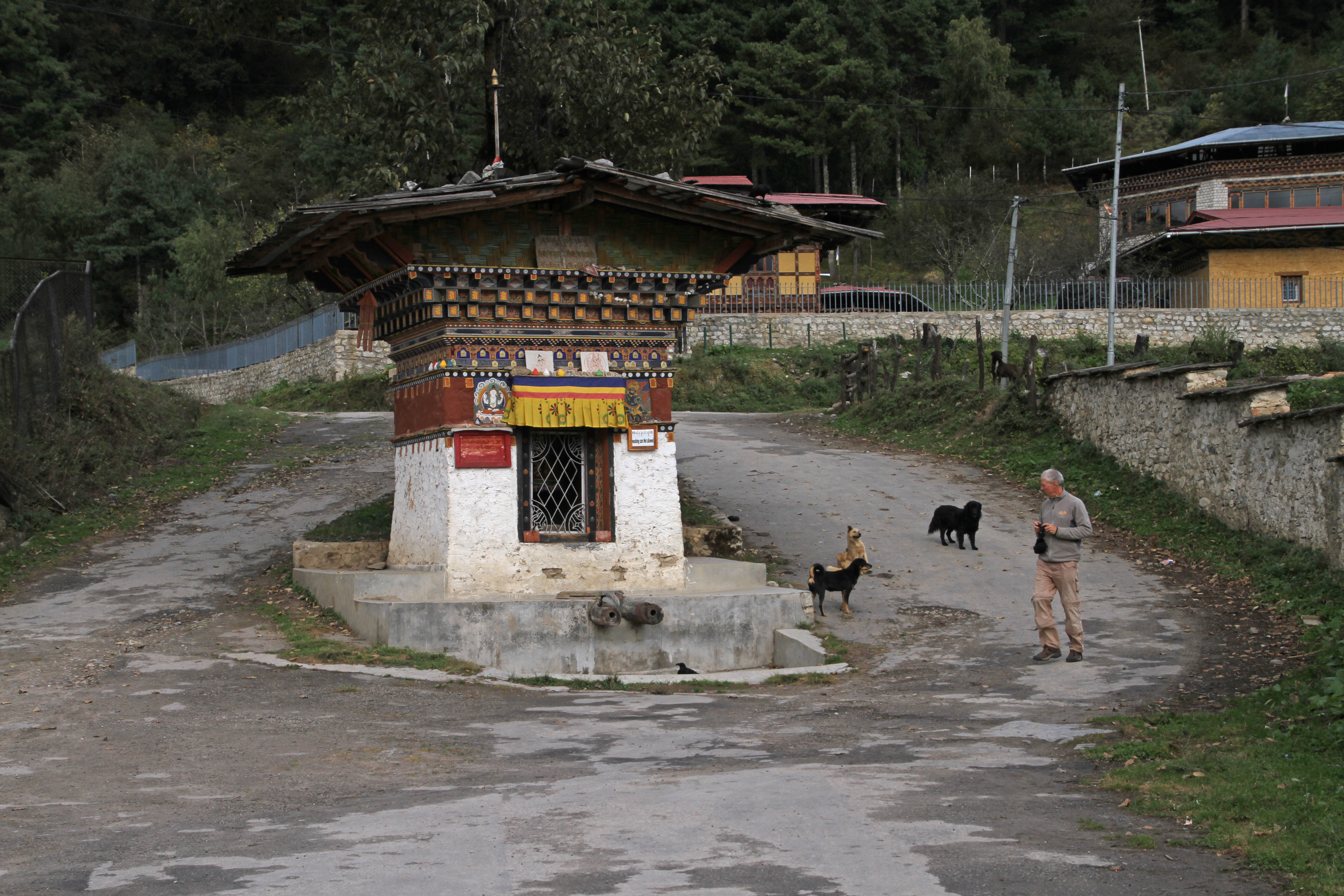

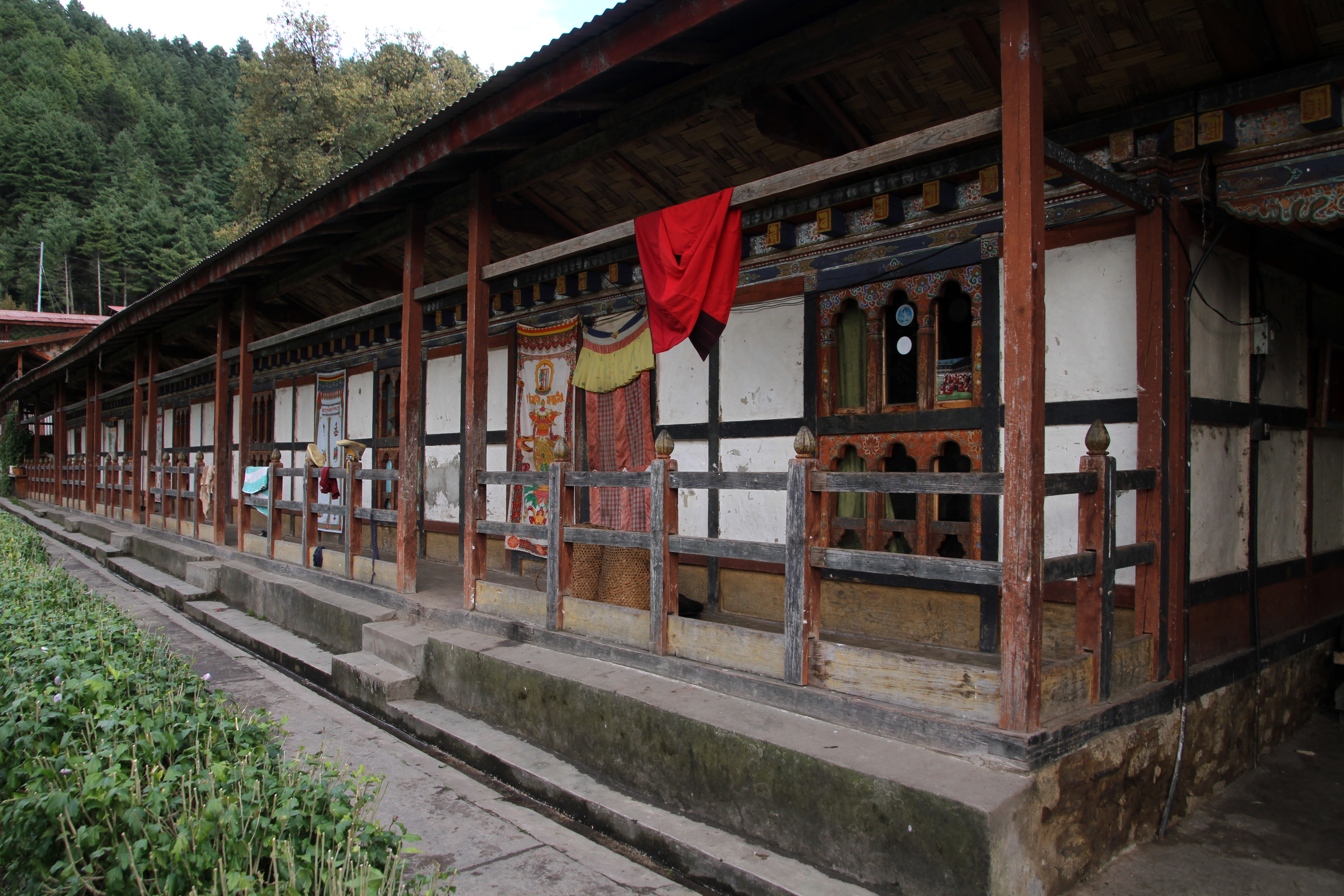

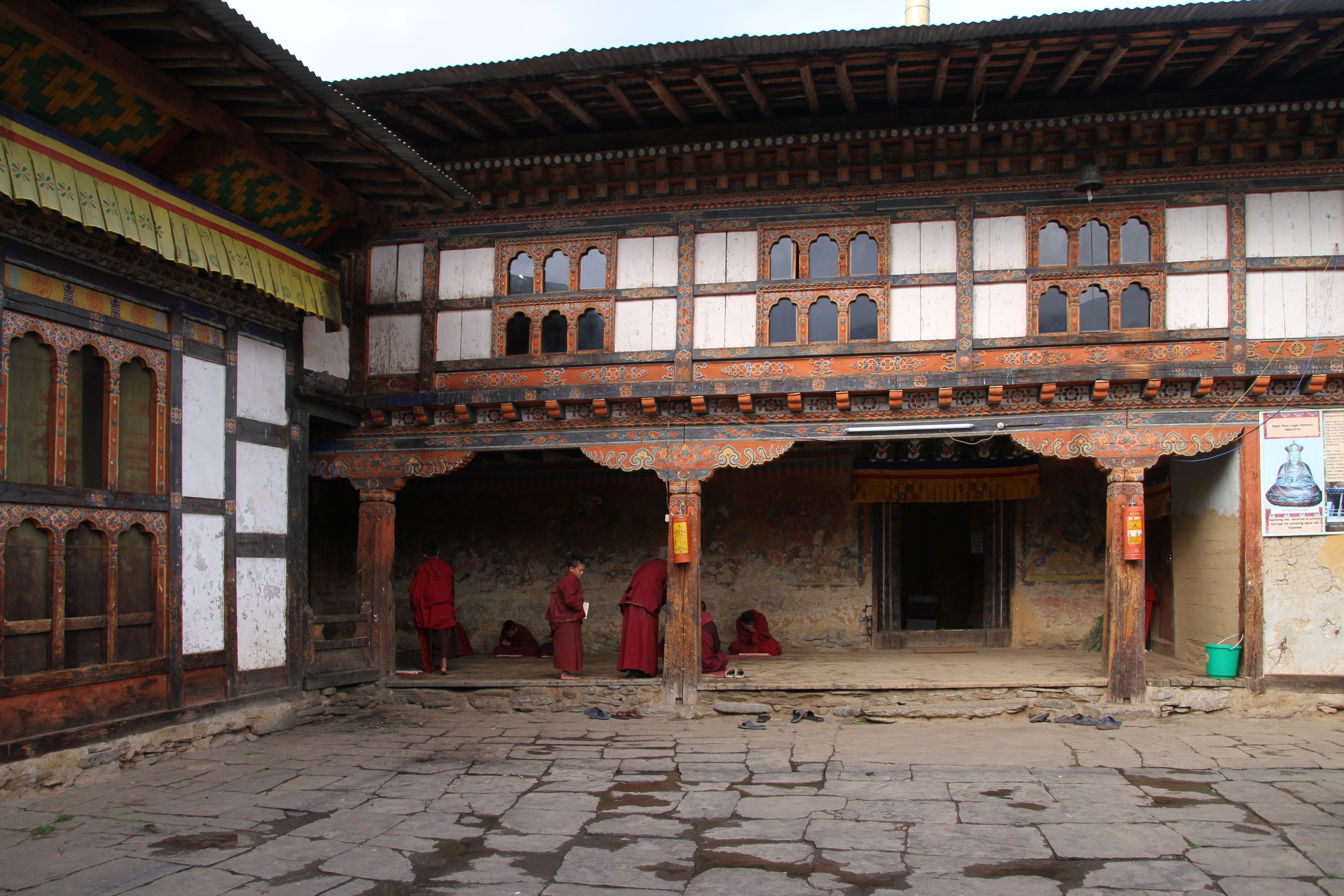

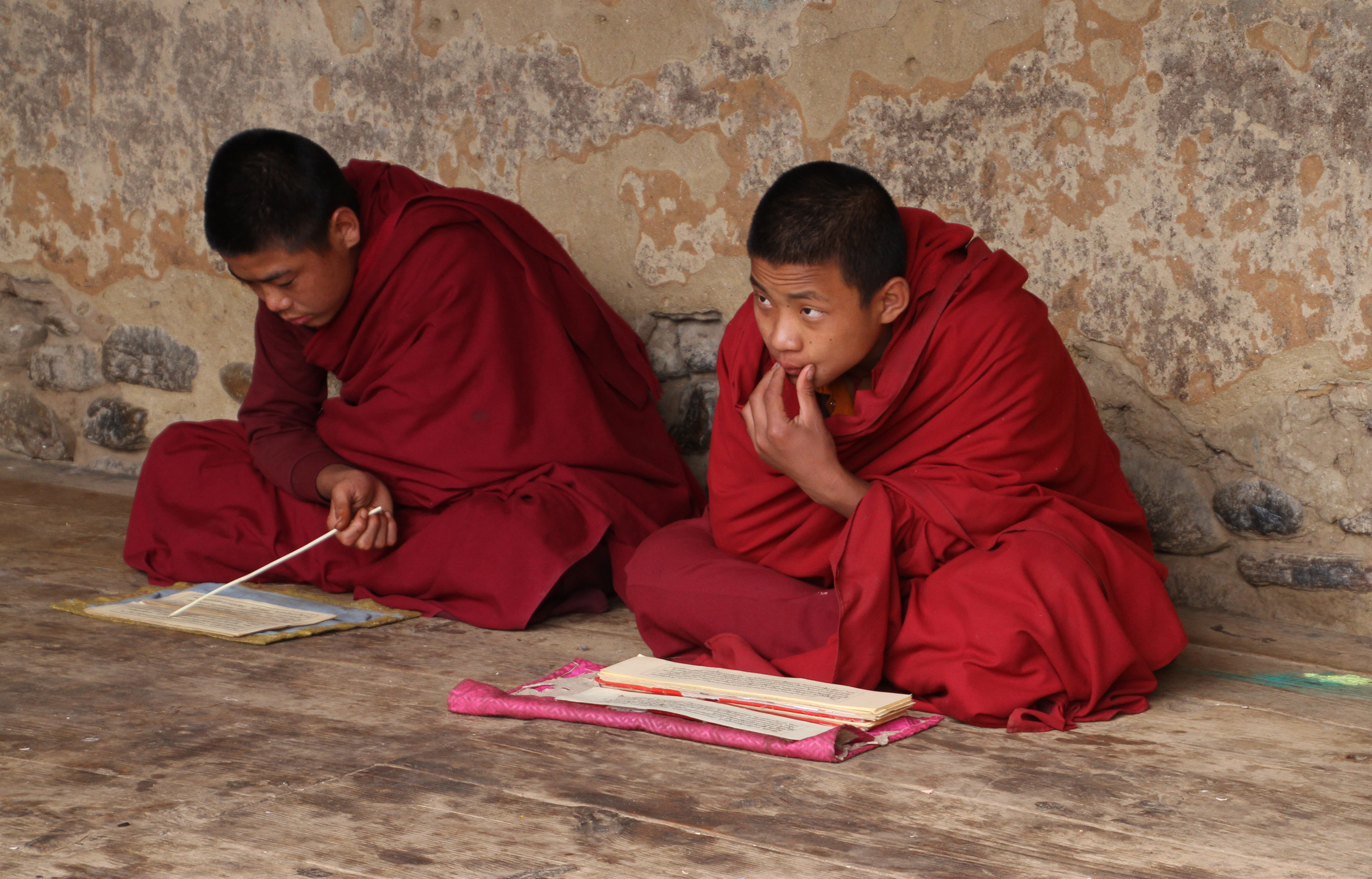
