= Kurjey =

- Location in Bhutan
- Coordinates: 27°37′N 90°42′E
- Country: Bhutan
- District: Bumthang District
- Time zone: UTC+6 (BTT)

Kurjey is a town in Bumthang District in central Bhutan.
