= Brokkat language =

Tibetic language spoken in Bhutan

Brokkat
- Jokay
- Region: Bhutan
- Native speakers: (300 cited 1993)
- Language family: Sino-Tibetan: Tibeto-Kanauri ?; Bodish; Tibetic; Dzongkha–Lhokä; Brokkat
- Writing system: Tibetan script

Language codes
- ISO 639-3: bro
- Glottolog: brok1249
- ELP: Brokkat
- Brokkat is classified as Definitely Endangered by the UNESCO Atlas of the World's Languages in Danger

Brokkat (Dzongkha: བྲོཀ་ཁ་; Wylie: Brok-kha; also called Brokskad and Jokay) is an endangered Southern Tibetic language spoken by about 300 people in the village of Dhur in Bumthang Valley of Bumthang District in central Bhutan. Brokkat is spoken by descendants of pastoral yakherd communities.

== See also ==
- Languages of Bhutan
