= Nangnang, Bhutan =

Nangnang
- Location in Bhutan
- Coordinates: 27°36′N 90°53′E
- Country: Bhutan
- District: Lhuntse District
- Time zone: UTC+6 (BTT)

Nangnang is a town in Bumthang in northern-central Bhutan.
