= Chhume Gewog =

- Gewog
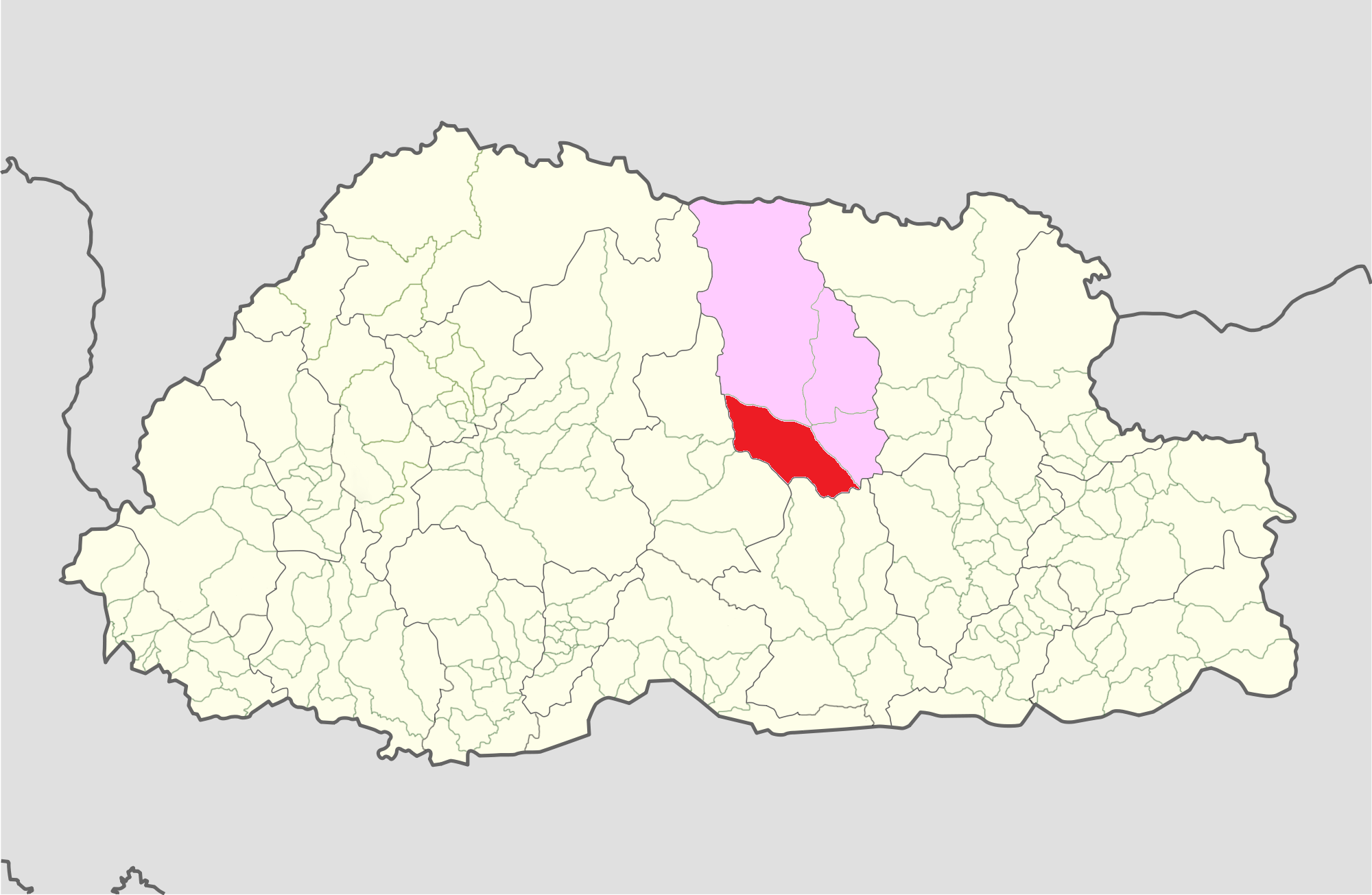
- Location of Chhume Gewog within Bumthang
- Coordinates: 27°29′40″N 90°40′00″E
- Country: Bhutan
- District: Bumthang District

Area
  - Total: 404 km^{2} (156 sq mi)

Population
  - Total: 3,591
  - Density: 8.89/km^{2} (23.0/sq mi)
- Time zone: UTC+6 (BTT)

Chhume Gewog (Wylie: chu smad, Bumthangkha: Chunmat) is a gewog (village block) of Bumthang District, Bhutan. The dominant local language is Bumthang, a close relation to Dzongkha.

== See also ==
- Chhoekhor
