= Ogyen Choeling Monastery =

Buddhist monastery in Bhutan

- Location within Bhutan

Religion
- Affiliation: Tibetan Buddhism
- Sect: Nyingma

Location
- Location: Bhutan
- Country: Bhutan
- Coordinates: 27°35′08″N 90°53′22″E

Ogyen Choeling Monastery is a Buddhist monastery in Bhutan.
