= Membartsho =

Holy site in Bhutan

Coordinates: 27°32′26″N 90°48′47″E

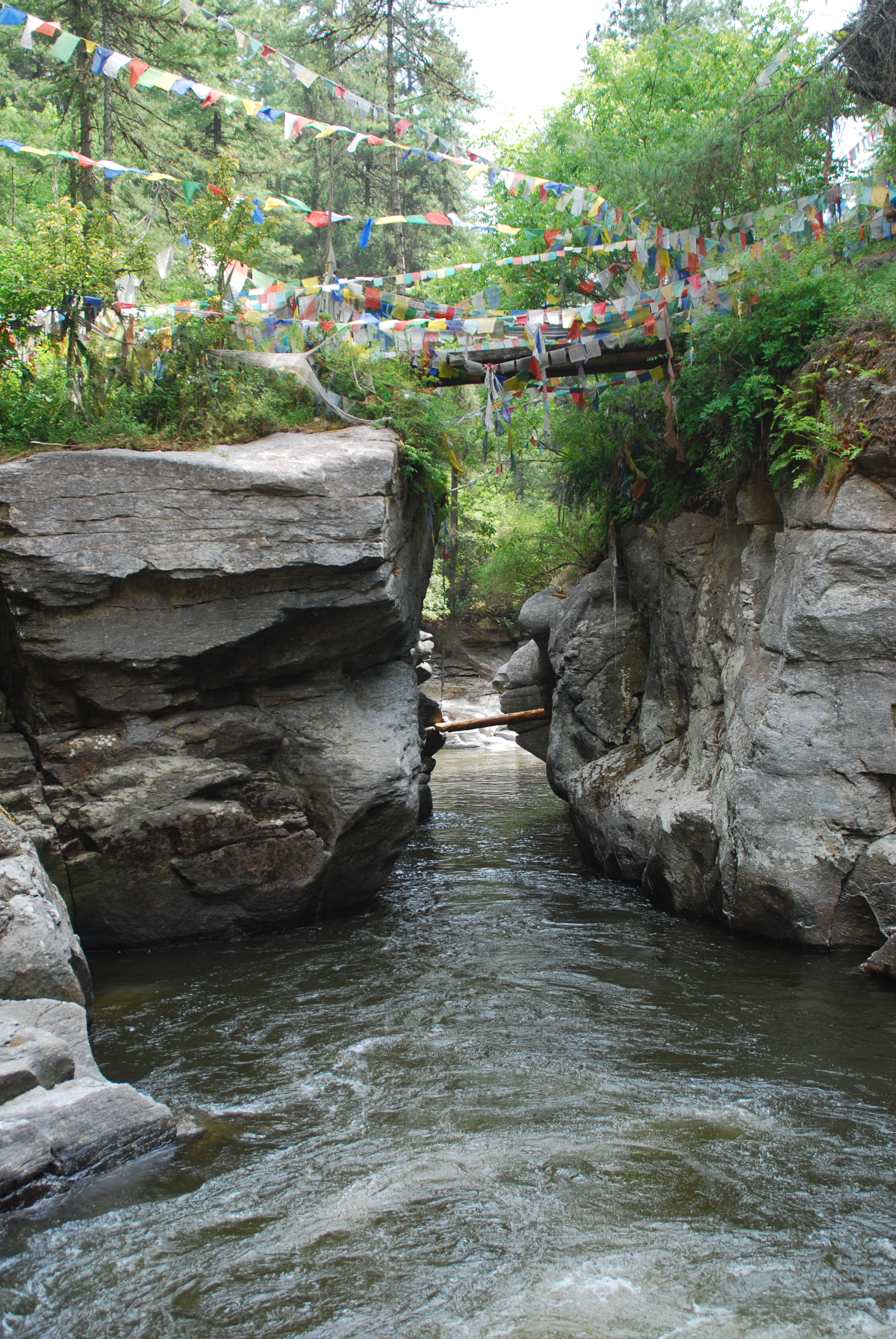
The rickety wooden bridge that crosses the Tang Chhu at Membartsho.

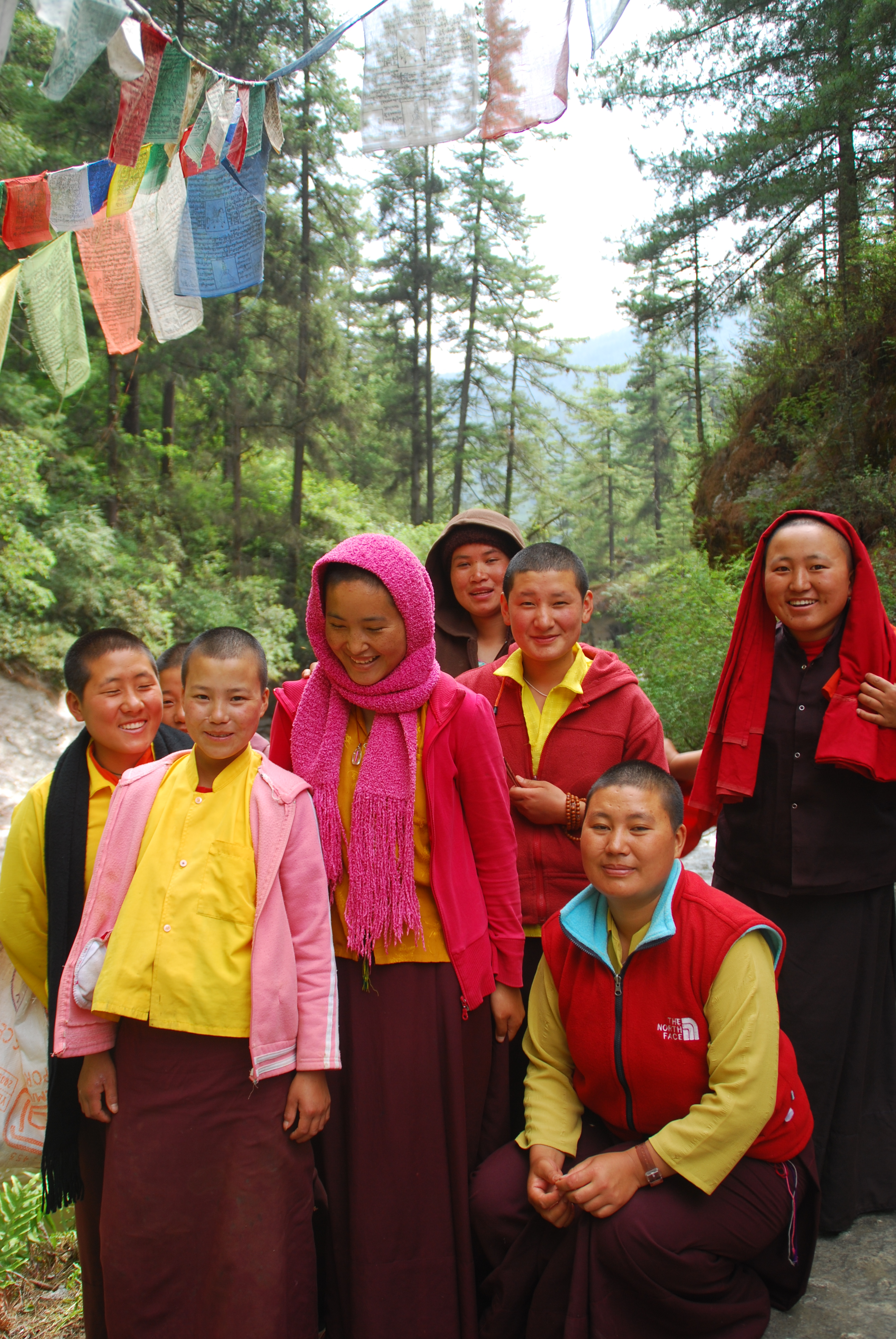
The nuns of Pema Tekchok Choling Nunnery who care for the sacred site of Membartsho

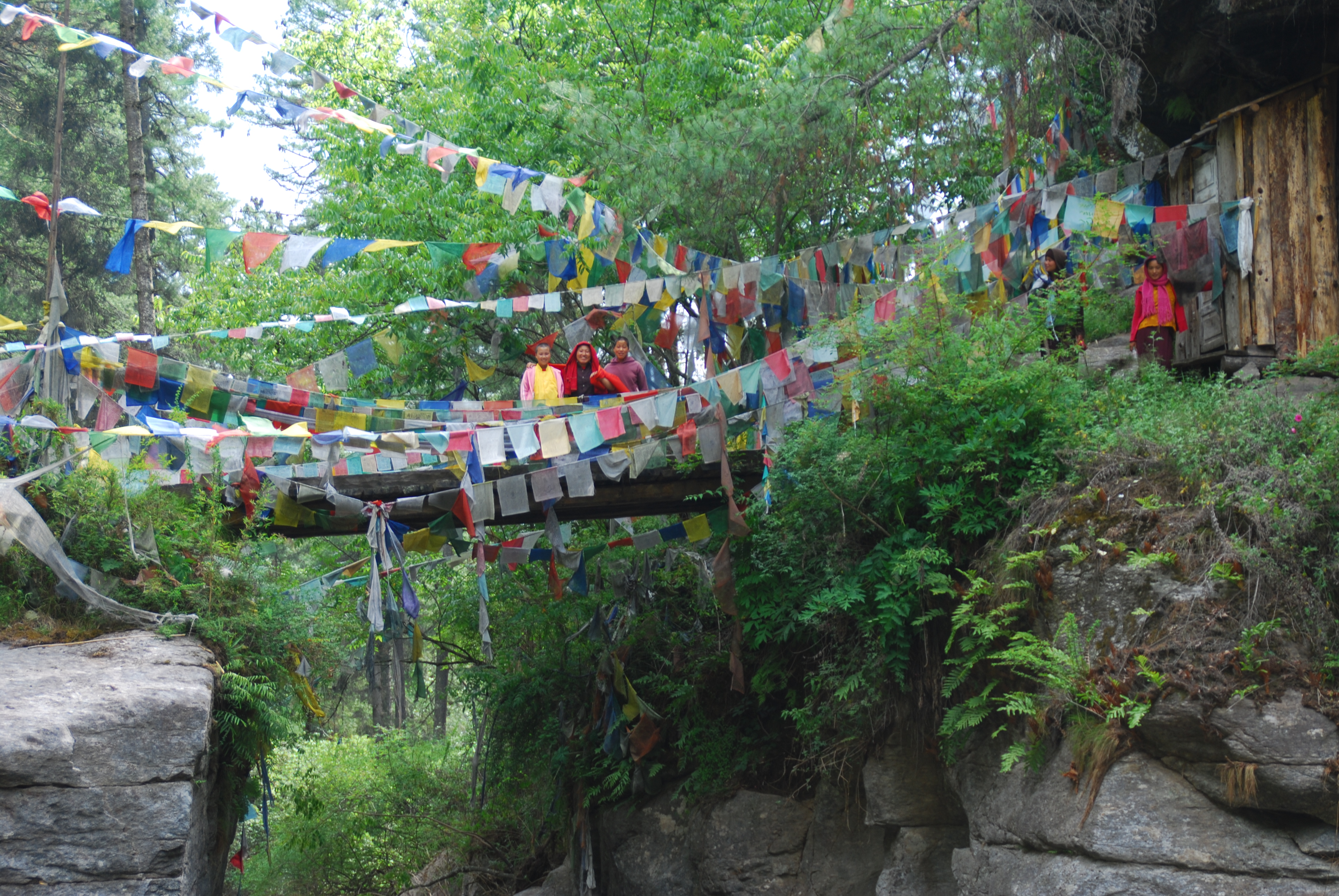
The nuns of Pema Choling Nunnery look after the sacred site of Membartsho

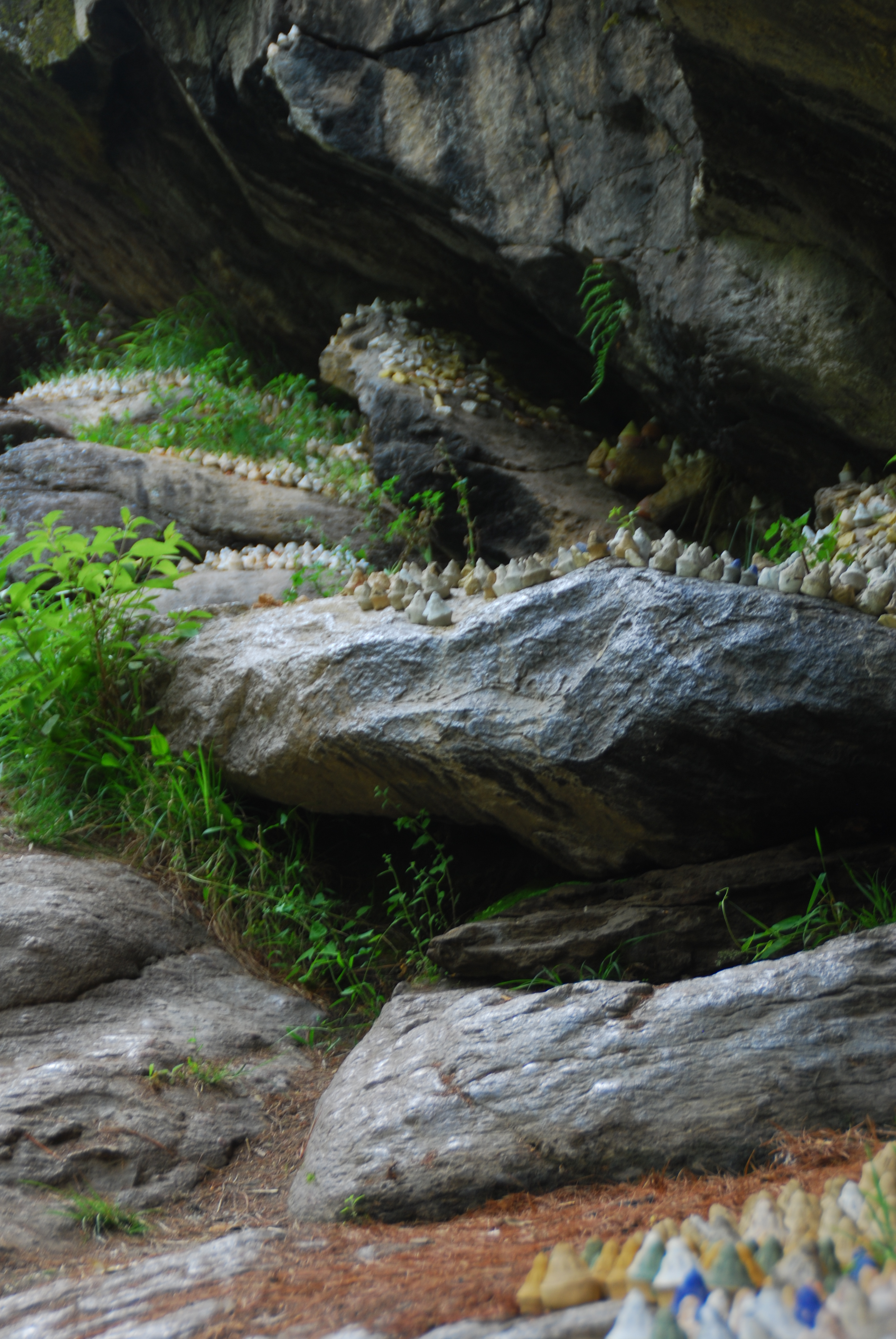
Offerings left by the river

Membartsho (Dzongkha མེ་འབར་མཚོ།), also known as Mebar Tsho, is a holy site, revered as the place where Pema Lingpa, Bhutan's greatest tertön (treasure revealer), discovered several of Guru Rinpoche's terma in the 15th century. It is a 30-minute drive from Chamkhar town and takes around five minutes from the road end to the lake.

== History ==
The pool in the Tang Valley, near Bumthang in central Bhutan is known locally as the Burning Lake, because according to legend, Pema Lingpa had a dream urging him to go to that particular spot in the Tang Chuu river. After standing on the rocks looking into the depths he discerned there was a temple at the bottom with many doors, one of which was open. He dived in and swam into a large cave where a woman with one eye handed him a treasure chest. As he took it from her he found himself back on dry land. The local citizens and the ruling Penlop were cynical of his claims, so he invited them to return with him and he would retrieve another terma. Holding a lit lamp, he told the assembled crowd, "If I am a genuine revealer of treasures then may I return with the treasure and my lamp still alight. However, if I am a devil, may I drown." He dove in. After a while people became nervous that he was taking too long when suddenly he burst out of the water holding a statue, a treasure chest and the lamp in his hands was still alight.

The Mebar Tsho treasures discovered by Pema Lingpa include Self-spoken Guru statue, Scroll of the script and Ritual skull.

The lake is renowned for its beauty, serenity and spiritual significance as a "Ney", which is explained by Dr Karma Phuntsho, author of The History of Bhutan, as: "Natural and spiritual energies and vibes flow from the landscape of such powerful spots, making them conducive environments for spiritual experience. Thus, spiritual persons seek such places in order to speed up and enhance their spiritual practice." It is said that enlightened beings can see the temple at the bottom of the lake.

Pema Lingpa prophesied that one day there would be a great center of learning for women in the center of the Tang Valley and that has come to pass. The site is maintained by the nuns of nearby Pema Tekchok Choling Nunnery, which was founded in 2000 and is Bhutan's first shedra (Buddhist university) for women. It was established by Gangteng Tulku Rinpoche, the ninth reincarnation of Pema Lingpa. The nuns have built a small cupboard near the rickety wooden bridge that crosses the narrowest part of the gorge, where they store butter lamps to make offerings at the sacred site. In many areas around the lake there are arrays of small conical clay mounds, called tsatsas (tsha tsha). These are often engraved with a sacred Buddhist symbol and sometimes contain human ash or bone. These distinctive little sculptures are offerings that are made as part of religious practices, and they can be dedicated to either the living or dead.

The site is also slippery, with a fast current and can be dangerous. Five people have drowned there since 2011, including a French tourist and his Bhutanese guide in 2015.
