= Jakar Dzong =

Fortress in Bumthang, Bhutan

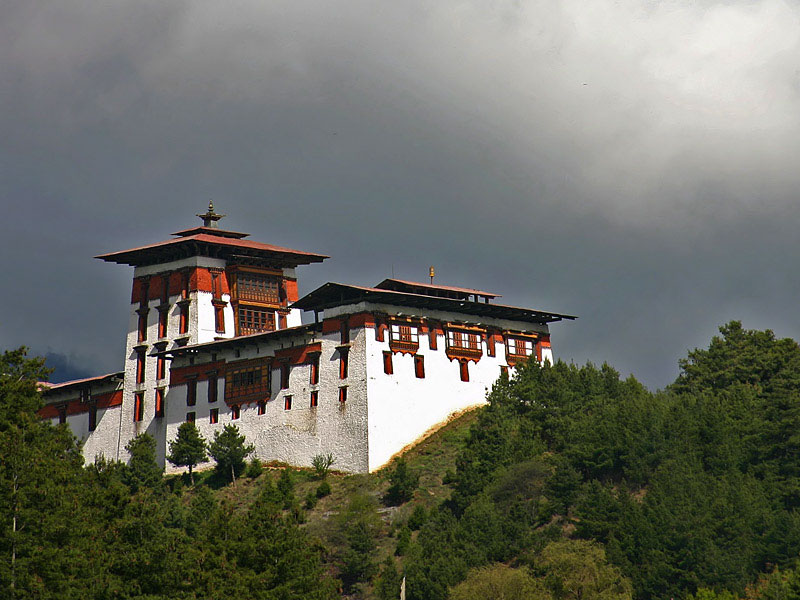
- Jakar Dzong

Religion
- Affiliation: Tibetan Buddhism

Location
- Interactive map of Jakar Dzong
- Coordinates: 27°32′56″N 90°44′37″E

Architecture
- Established: 1549; 477 years ago

Jakar Dzong or Jakar Yugyal Dzong is the dzong or fortress of the Bumthang District in central Bhutan. It is located on a ridge above Jakar town in the Chamkhar valley of Bumthang. It is built on the site of an earlier temple established by the Ralung hierarch Yongzin Ngagi Wangchuk (1517–1554) when he came to Bhutan. Jakar Dzong may be the largest dzong in Bhutan, with a circumference of more than 1,500 metres (4,900 ft).

The name Jakar is derived from the word bjakhab, meaning "white bird", in reference to Jakar's foundation myth, according to which a roosting white bird signaled the proper and auspicious location to found a monastery. Jakar Dzong, or the ''castle of the white bird',' dominates the Chamkhar valley and overlooks the town. Constructed in 1549, by the Tibetan lama Ngagi Wangchuk, who came to Bhutan to spread the Drukpa Kagyu teaching, the dzong played an important role as the fortress of defense for the whole eastern dzongkhags. It also became the seat of the first king of Bhutan in 1646, after the Zhabdrung had firmly established his power. Jakar Dzong is the nation's largest dzong. Its official name is Yuelay Namgyal Dzong, named in honor of the victory over the troops of Tibetan ruler Phuntsho Namgyal.

== History ==
In the 17th century, the ruler of Tsang in Tibet, Phuntsho Namgyel, sent an army twice to destroy Zhabdrung. During these campaigns the Dzong was damaged but was later renovated by the Trongsa Penlop. In 1679 the Tibetan invaders camped by a nearby hill in Bumthang. As Bhutan did not have an institutionalized armed force to fight back the enemies, they sought the help of the protecting deities, Choe Chhong Chamdal sum. Tenzin Rabgay sanctified the newly built Dzong and a man named Longwa was chosen as the first Dzongpon. Longwa was the reincarnation of king Sindu Gyab (Sindhu raja). He was born according to the prophecy of Guru Rinpoche.
