= Jakar =

Jakar བྱ་ཀར་ Byakar
- Thromde
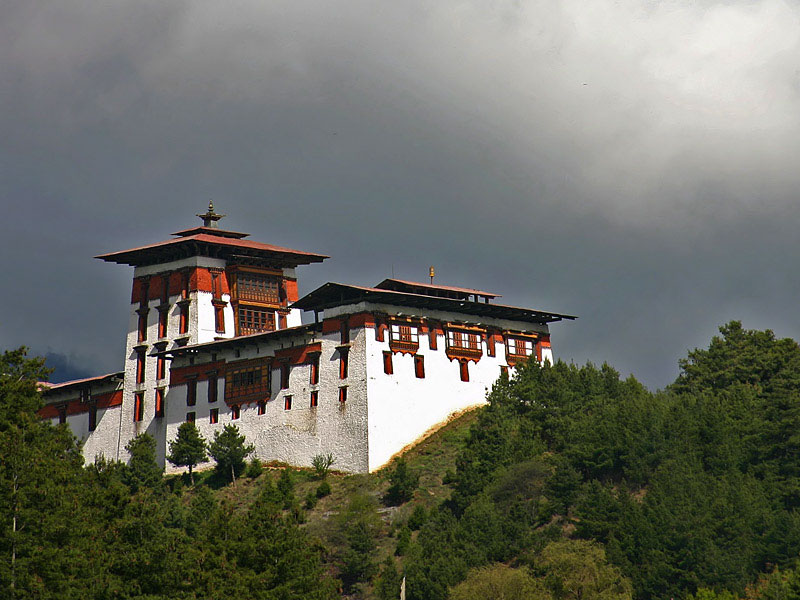
- Jakar Dzong

- Location in Bhutan
- Coordinates: 27°33′0″N 90°44′0″E
- Country: Bhutan
- Dzongkhag: Bumthang
- Gewog: Chhoekhor
- Settled: ca. 1549
- Elevation: 2,587 m (8,488 ft)

Population (2017)
  - Total: 6,243
- Time zone: UTC+06:00 (BTT)
- Climate: Cwb

Jakar (Dzongkha: བྱ་ཀར་, romanized: Bya-kar) is a town in the central-eastern region of Bhutan. It is the district capital (dzongkhag thromde) of Bumthang District and the location of Jakar Dzong, the regional dzong fortress. The name Jakar roughly translates as "white bird" in reference to its foundation myth, according to which a roosting white bird signalled the proper and auspicious location to found a monastery around 1549.

== History ==
The town is the site of Chakhar Lhakhang, a small and unassuming temple which marks the site of the "Iron Palace" of Sindhu Raja, the Indian monarch who is believed to have first invited Guru Rinpoche to Bhutan in 746. The current building is said to have been constructed by Tertön Dorje Lingpa in the 14th century.

According to the Jakar foundation myth, a roosting white bird signaled the proper and auspicious location to found a monastery around 1549. The settlement thus earned the moniker Jakar, meaning "white bird."

There are many significant Buddhist sacred sites nearby the town, such as Kurjey Lhakhang, which holds a body print of Guru Rinpoche; Jambey Lhakhang, one of the 108 monasteries that in mythology were miraculously constructed by King Songten Gampo in one night; and Tamsshing Lhakhag established by Tertön Padma Lingpa (1450–1521). In addition, one of the country's largest monastic colleges, Lhodrak Kharchhu Monastery, overlooks Jakar.

== Geography ==
=== Location ===
Jakar is located in Bumthang (Choekhor) Valley within Chhoekhor Gewog in central Bumthang. Administratively, however, Jakar is a separate thromde (municipality) inside the gewog. The administrative office for the Choekhor Gewog is located in the northern suburbs of Jakar. Just north of Jakar lies Wangchuck Centennial Park, a protected area of Bhutan.

=== Climate ===
Jakar has a subtropical highland climate (Köppen: Cwb).

Climate data for Jakar, elevation 2,470 m (8,100 ft), (1996–2017 normals)
Month	Jan	Feb	Mar	Apr	May	Jun	Jul	Aug	Sep	Oct	Nov	Dec	Year
Record high °C (°F)	18.5 (65.3)	20.0 (68.0)	23.0 (73.4)	24.0 (75.2)	25.5 (77.9)	28.0 (82.4)	27.0 (80.6)	27.0 (80.6)	26.5 (79.7)	24.0 (75.2)	22.0 (71.6)	19.0 (66.2)	28.0 (82.4)
Mean daily maximum °C (°F)	11.4 (52.5)	13.0 (55.4)	15.3 (59.5)	17.5 (63.5)	19.7 (67.5)	21.9 (71.4)	22.7 (72.9)	22.7 (72.9)	21.6 (70.9)	18.8 (65.8)	15.5 (59.9)	12.9 (55.2)	17.8 (63.9)
Daily mean °C (°F)	3.8 (38.8)	6.0 (42.8)	8.7 (47.7)	11.7 (53.1)	14.6 (58.3)	17.5 (63.5)	18.6 (65.5)	18.5 (65.3)	17.1 (62.8)	12.9 (55.2)	8.4 (47.1)	5.0 (41.0)	11.9 (53.4)
Mean daily minimum °C (°F)	−3.9 (25.0)	−1.1 (30.0)	2.1 (35.8)	5.9 (42.6)	9.5 (49.1)	13.0 (55.4)	14.4 (57.9)	14.2 (57.6)	12.5 (54.5)	7.0 (44.6)	1.3 (34.3)	−2.9 (26.8)	6.0 (42.8)
Record low °C (°F)	−13.0 (8.6)	−11.0 (12.2)	−7.0 (19.4)	−2.5 (27.5)	0.0 (32.0)	3.0 (37.4)	10.0 (50.0)	9.5 (49.1)	4.5 (40.1)	−5.0 (23.0)	−10.0 (14.0)	−13.5 (7.7)	−13.5 (7.7)
Average rainfall mm (inches)	5.9 (0.23)	10.6 (0.42)	34.2 (1.35)	66.6 (2.62)	94.4 (3.72)	97.6 (3.84)	155.9 (6.14)	138.7 (5.46)	89.1 (3.51)	57.3 (2.26)	6.9 (0.27)	1.9 (0.07)	759.1 (29.89)
Average rainy days	0.8	2.2	6.5	12.3	15.7	16.2	21.7	19.6	14.5	6.6	0.9	0.4	117.4
Average relative humidity (%)	72.3	70.5	68.7	69.6	70.7	73.4	77.6	78.0	75.5	72.0	68.5	73.1	72.5
Source 1: National Center for Hydrology and Meteorology
Source 2: World Meteorological Organization (rainy days 1996–2018)

== Transport ==
Jakar is accessed via a north-south road that connects to the Lateral Road, the main highway of Bhutan.

Jakar is also the site of Bathpalathang Airport. The airport formed part of the Royal Bhutanese Government's 10th Five Year Plan (2008). The airport was originally scheduled to open in October 2010, but faced many delays due to soil stability, river diversion, funding, and labour. Labour and material shortages through early 2011 prompted a new target date of July 2011, however as of September 2011, the airport had not been opened for operations. Further complications have arisen from legislated land and property compensation schemes for those who have been forced to move to accommodate the airport. Both Drukair and Tashi Air conducted inaugural flights to Bathpalathang on 17 December 2011—coinciding with the national day of Bhutan. The first commercial Drukair flight between Paro and Bathpalathang occurred on 23 December 2011; it failed to make a profit.

== Main sights ==
=== Jakar Dzong ===
Constructed in 1667, Jakar Dzong sits atop a ridge above the town of Jakar. The dzong fortress is now an administrative center. It may be the largest dzong in Bhutan, with a circumference of more than 1,500 metres (4,900 ft).

== Tourism ==
Being located in the spacious and tree covered Bumthang (Choekhor) Valley, the area is also a popular tourist destination, and consequently the town is served by several hotels, craft shops, and guest houses.

The bazaar is located on a street of single story buildings in an area of the town called Chamkhar. A new bazaar consisting of three story traditional buildings in the Dekiling area was planned to be completed in 2010.

== Culture ==
Jakar, like the rest of Bumthang District and its neighbors, is culturally part of eastern Bhutan. While Dzongkha is the national language of administration and instruction, local languages include Bumthang and Brokkat. Jakar is famous throughout Bhutan for its distinctive and brightly colored woven wool items called yethra.

== Schools ==
There are 19 schools in the dzongkhag. There are two higher secondary schools, three middle secondary schools and two lower secondary schools and the rest are community schools.

== Gallery ==
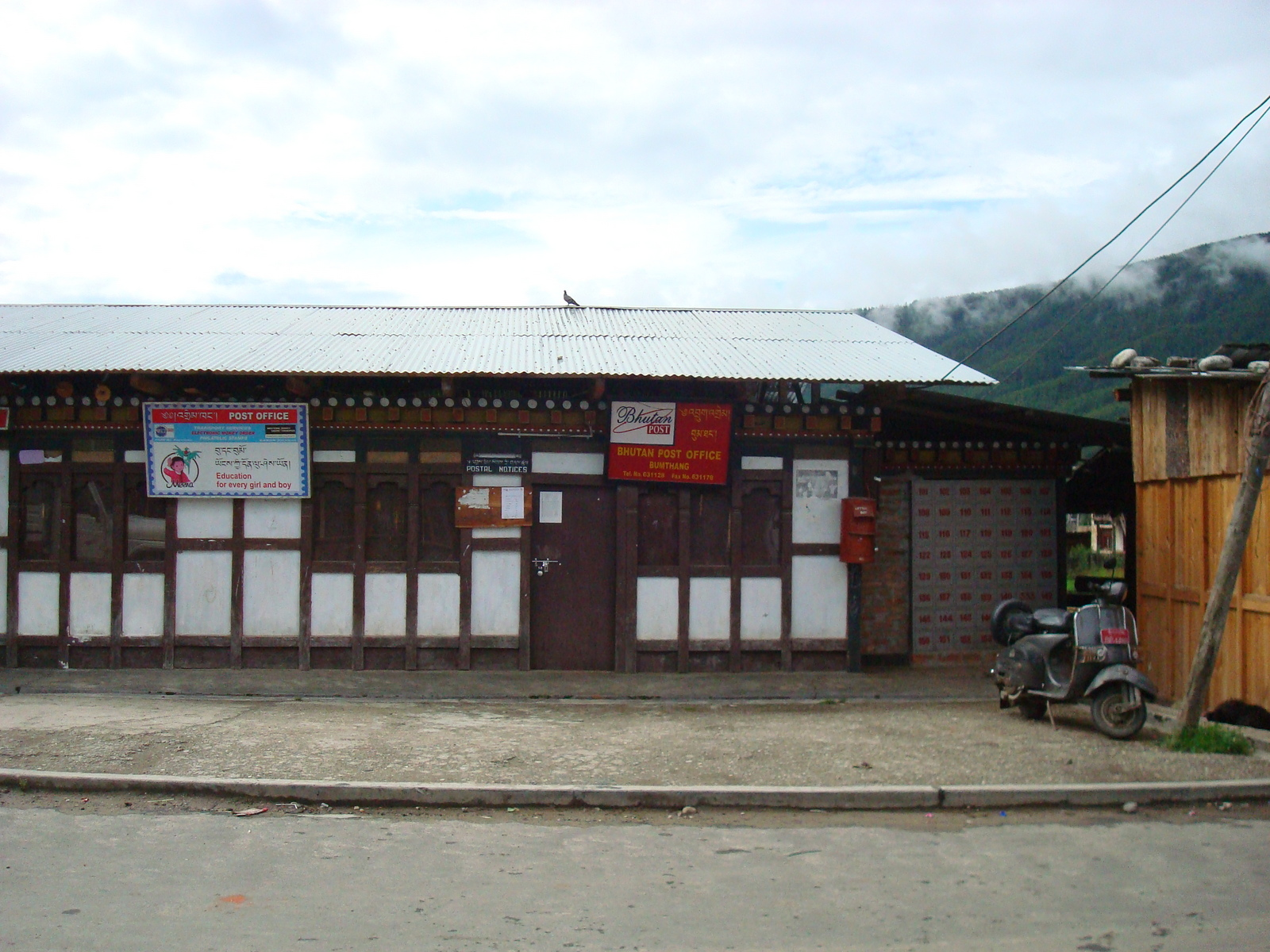
Post office of Bumthang town

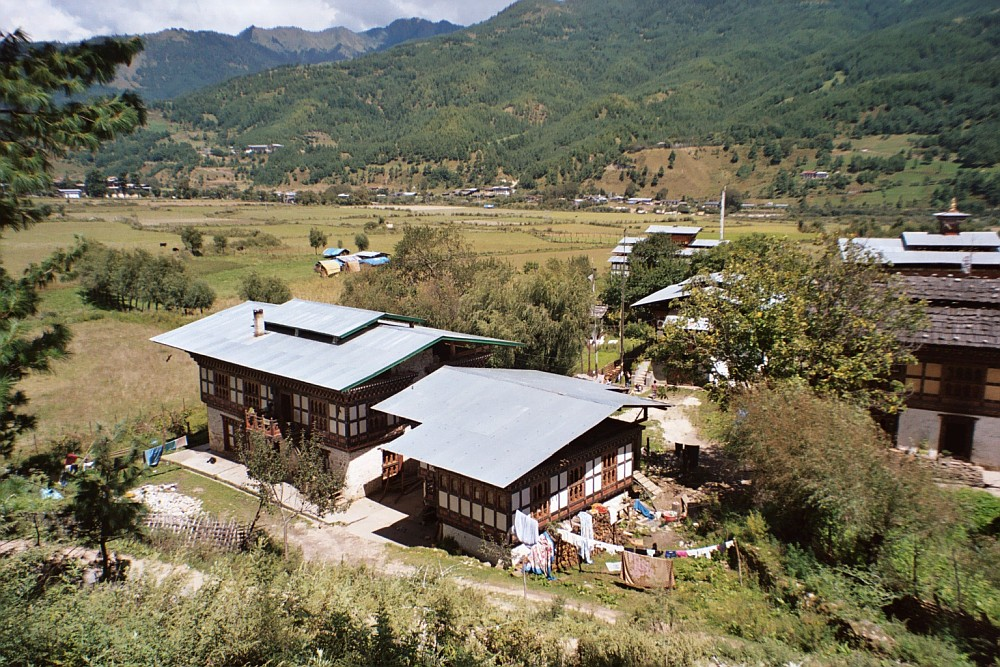
Houses near Jakar

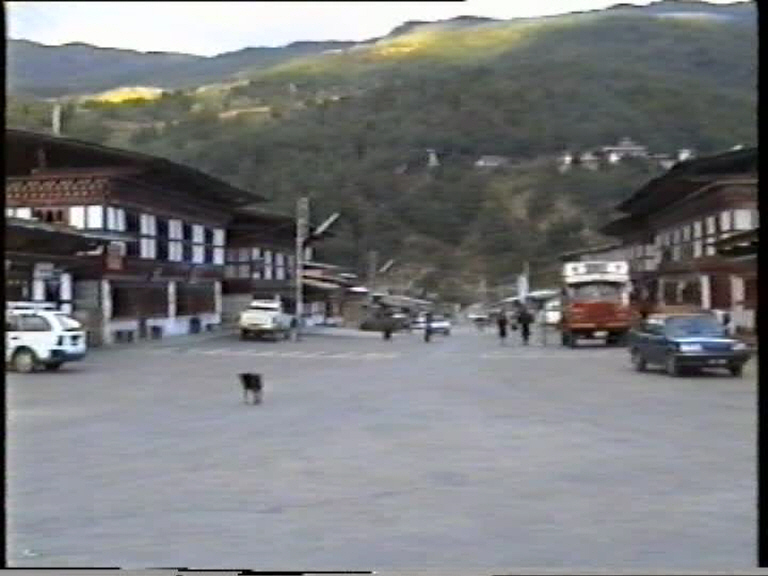
Jakar street

== See also ==
- Bathpalathang Airport
