= Chhoekhor Gewog =

Choekor Gewog
- Gewog
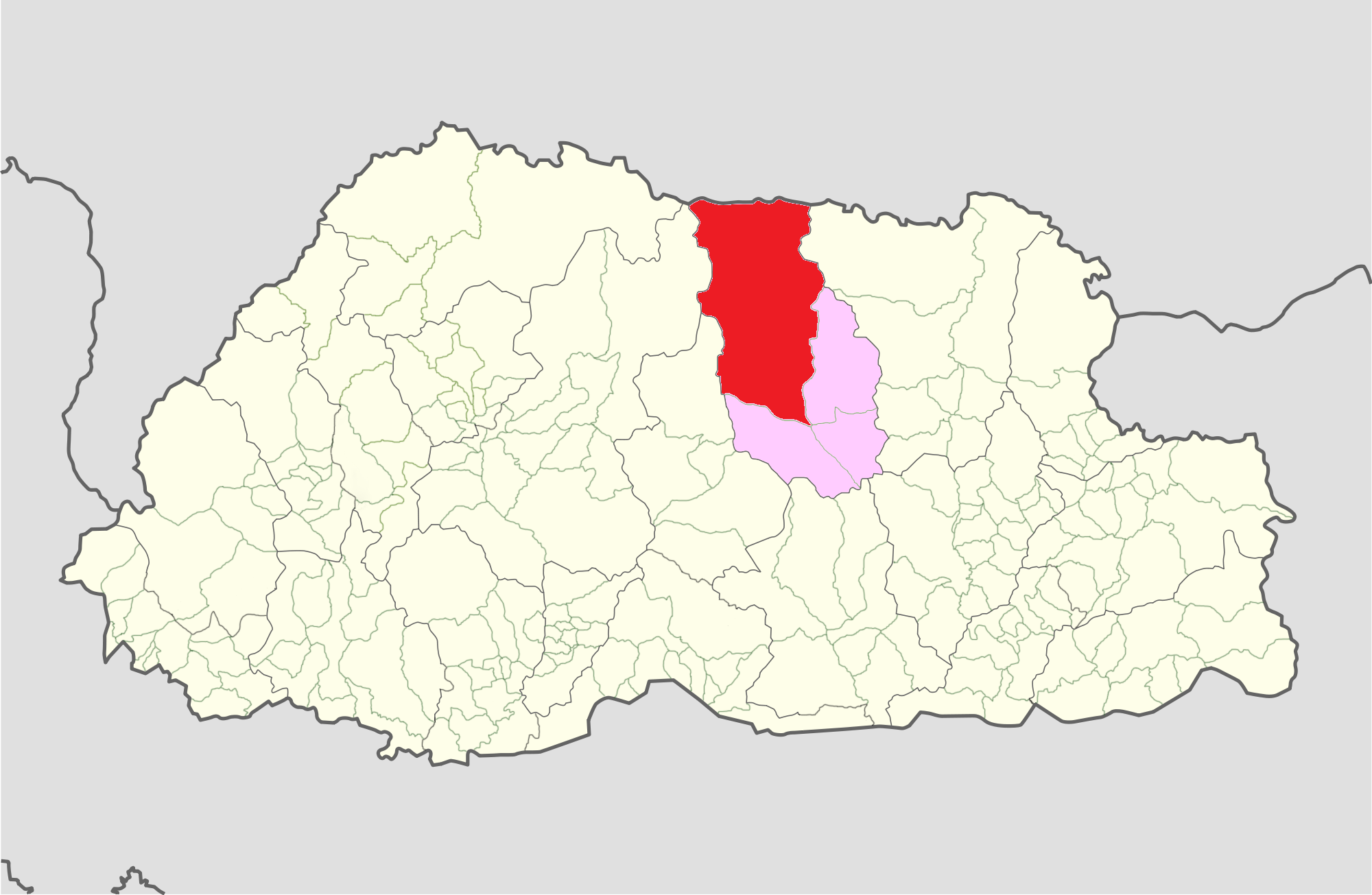
- Location of Chhoekhor Gewog within Bumthang
- Coordinates: 27°33′33″N 90°44′00″E
- Country: Bhutan
- District: Bumthang District

Area
  - Total: 1,649 km^{2} (637 sq mi)

Population
  - Total: 4,553
  - Density: 2.761/km^{2} (7.151/sq mi)
- Time zone: UTC+6 (BTT)

Choekor Gewog is a gewog (village block) of Bumthang District, Bhutan.

== See also ==
- Kurjey
