= Ura Gewog =

Ura Gewog ཨུ་ར་རྒེད་འོག
- Gewog
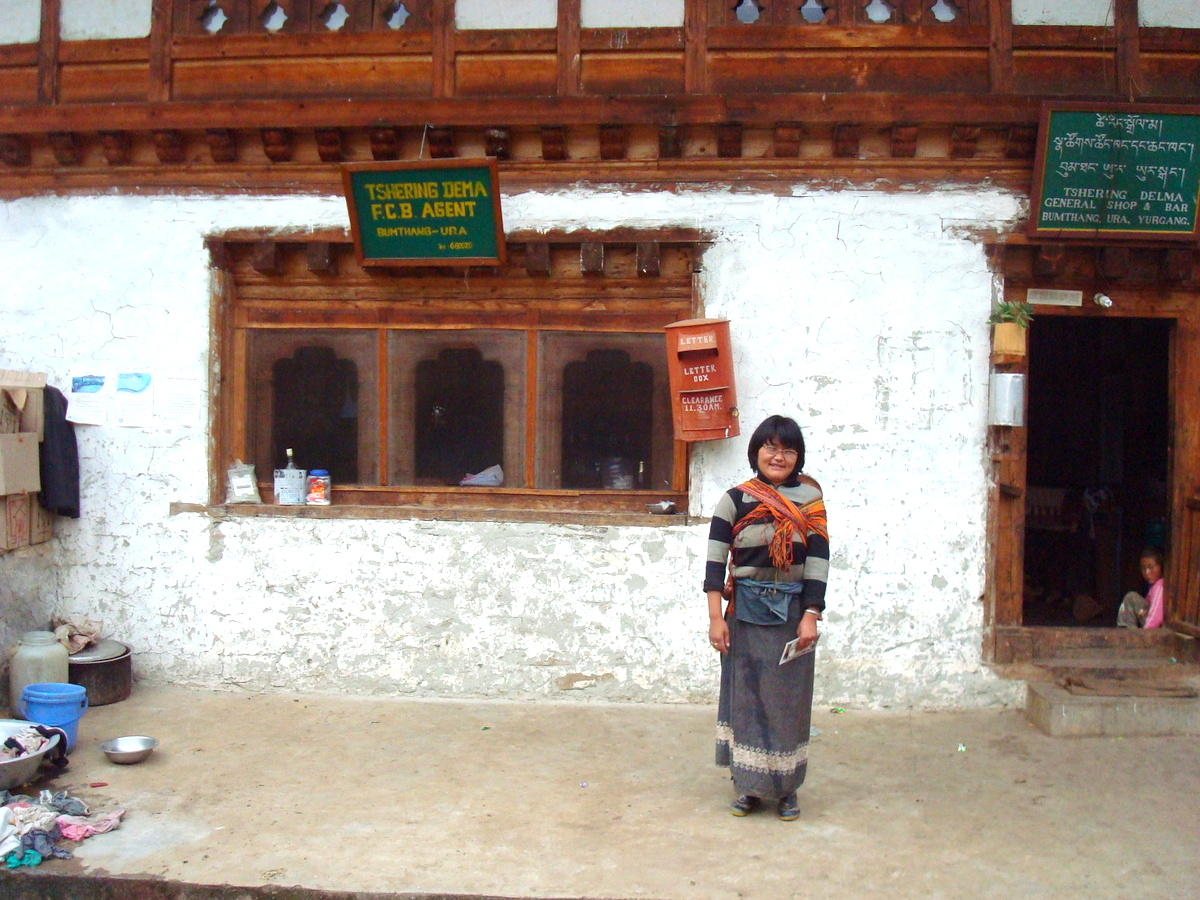
- Grocery shop and community mail office in Ura, Bumthang district

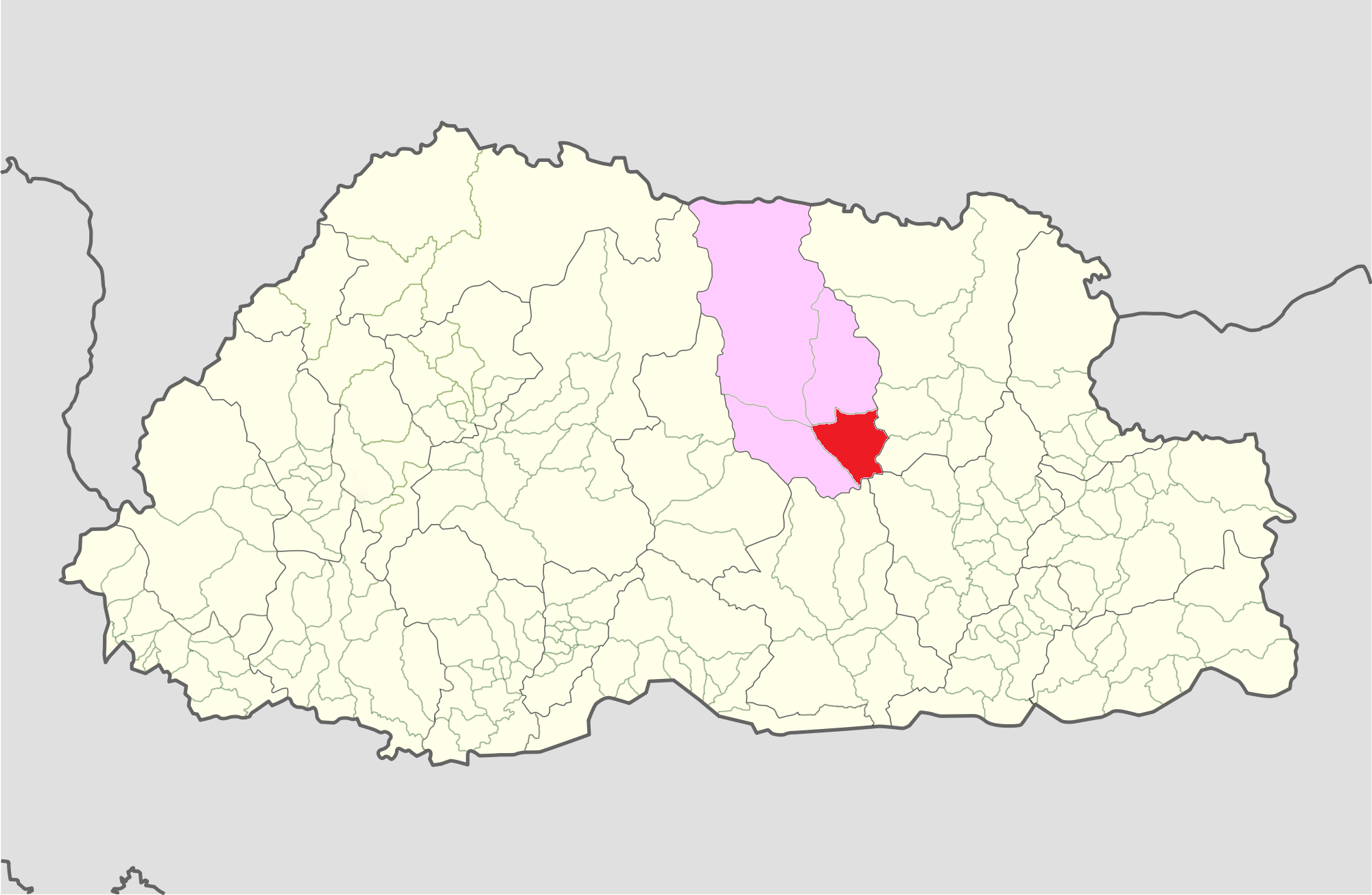
- Location of Ura Gewog within Bumthang
- Coordinates: 27°28′N 90°54′E
- Country: Bhutan
- District: Bumthang District

Area
  - Total: 265 km^{2} (102 sq mi)

Population
  - Total: 2,288
  - Density: 8.63/km^{2} (22.4/sq mi)
- Time zone: UTC+6 (BTT)

Ura (Dzongkha: ཨུ་ར་རྒེད་འོག) is a gewog (village block) of Bumthang District, Bhutan. Ura Gewog consists of ten major villages: Tangsibi, Shingnyeer, Shingkhar, Pangkhar, Somthrang, Beteng, Trabi, Tarshong, Toepa and Chari with 301 households and a population of 2288, covering an area of around 265 sq. kilometer with some 82% of forest coverage. The Gewog is located in the southeastern part of Bumthang District, 48 km distance from Dzongkhag Offices. It is bordered by Chhokhor and Chhumig gewog to the west, Tang gewog to the north, Zhemgang and Mongar District to the south and Lhuentse District to the east. The altitude of the gewog is around 3100 meters above sea level.
