= Bumthang District =

District of Bhutan

Coordinates: 27°45′N 90°40′E

Bumthang District བུམ་ཐང་རྫོང་ཁག།
- District
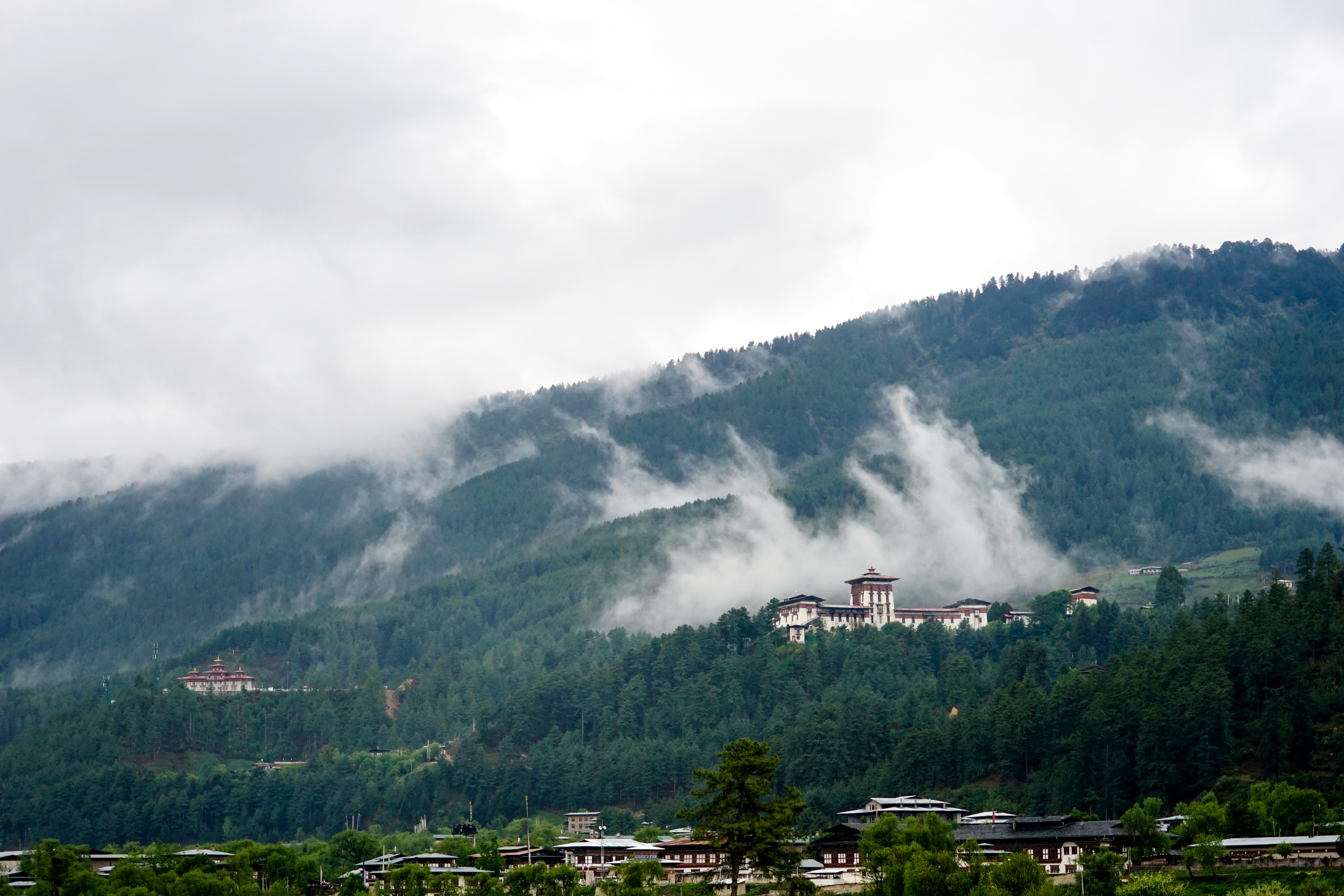
- Jakar Dzong in Bumthang

- Seal

- Location of Bumthang district within Bhutan
- Country: Bhutan
- Headquarters: Jakar

Area
  - Total: 2,717 km^{2} (1,049 sq mi)

Population (2017)
  - Total: 17,820
  - Density: 6.559/km^{2} (16.99/sq mi)
- Time zone: UTC+6 (BTT)
- HDI (2019): 0.661 medium · 6th
- Website: www.bumthang.gov.bt

Bumthang District (Dzongkha: བུམ་ཐང་རྫོང་ཁག།; Wylie: Bum-thang rzong-khag) is one of the 20 dzongkhag (districts) comprising Bhutan. It contains numerous temples and Buddhist sacred sites. The district is divided into four village blocks (or gewogs), each corresponding to a major glacial valley: Choekor, Tang, Ura, and Chhume. The latter valley is also called Bumthang, lending its name to the whole district.

Bumthang directly translates as "beautiful field" – thang means field or flat place, and bum is said be an abbreviation of either bumpa (a vessel for holy water, thus describing the shape and nature of the valley), or simply bum ("girl", indicating this is the valley of beautiful girls).

== Administrative divisions ==
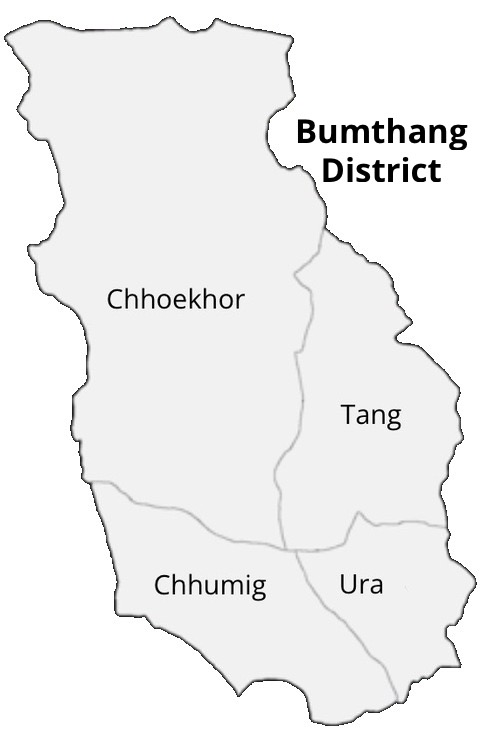
Map of Bumthang gewogs

Bumthang District is divided into four village blocks (or gewogs):

- Chhoekhor Gewog
- Chhume Gewog (also known as Chhumig)
- Tang Gewog
- Ura Gewog

== Economy ==
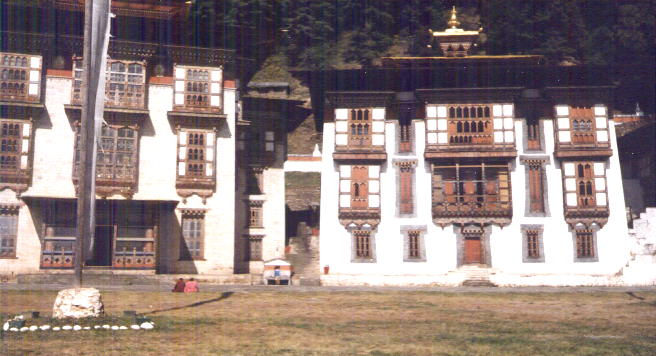
Kurje Lhakhang, Jakar

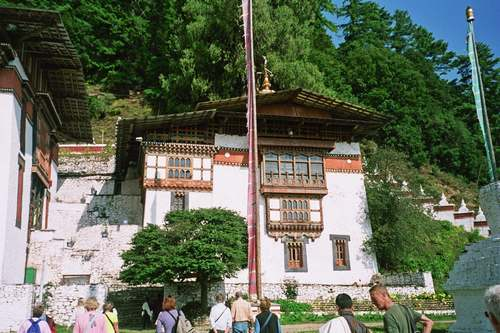
Kurje Lhakhang, Jakar

Tamshing Lhakhang, Jakar

Bumthang's primary agricultural products are wheat, buckwheat, dairy, honey, apples, potatoes, rice, and wool. Bumthang is also nationally famous for its textiles, such as yathra and mathra weaving.

== Languages ==
East Bodish languages are primarily spoken in Bumthang District.

The language spoken in the Bumthang district is known as Bumthangkha. It is a Tibeto-Burman language mutually intelligible with Khengkha and closely related to Dzongkha, the national language of Bhutan. Bumthangkha is partially comprehensible to speakers of Dzongkha, which originated in valleys to the west of Bumthang. Each of the four valleys of Bumthang has its own dialect, and the remnants of the Kheng kingdom, near and in Zhemgang District to the south, speak Khengkha. Historically, Bhumthangkha and its speakers have had close contact with speakers of Kurtöpkha to the east, Nupbikha to the west, and Khengkha to the south, to the extent that they may be considered part of a wider collection of "Bumthang languages".

Brokkat, an endangered Southern Bodish language, is spoken by about 300 people in the village of Dhur in Bumthang Valley. The language is a remnant of pastoral yakherd communities.

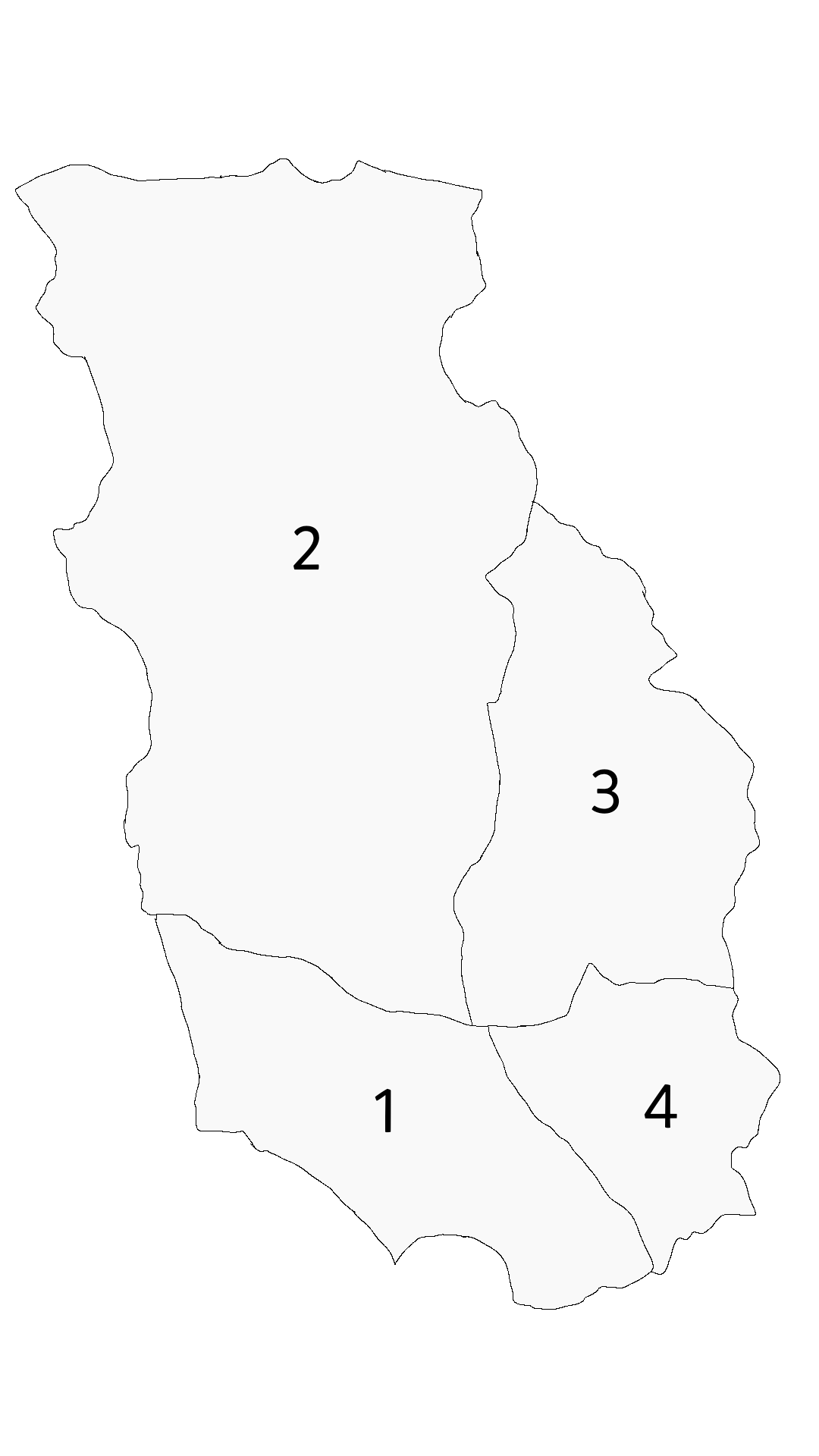
The map of Bumthang District's village blocks

== Environment ==
Most of Bumthang District is part of Bhutan's extensive protected areas network. The northern two-thirds of the district (the gewogs of Chhoekhor and Tang) belong to Wangchuck Centennial Park, buffered by pockets of biological corridors. Southern Bumthang (the gewogs of Chhumig and Ura) is part of another protected area, Thrumshingla National Park. Bumthang has a large migratory population of black-necked cranes, which hold cultural significance.

== Landmarks ==
- Membartsho (Burning Lake), where sacred scriptures were hidden by Padmasambhava in the 8th century and later recovered by Pema Lingpa in the 15th century.
- Kurjey Lhakhang, the final resting place of the remains of the first three Kings of Bhutan.
- Jakar Dzong, adjacent to the main town of Jakar.
- Jambay Lhakhang, one of the two most ancient temples of Bhutan, built in the 7th century by Songtsän Gampo, founder of the Tibetan Empire.
- Tamzhing Monastery, the most important Nyingma institution in the country.
- Padtshaling Gonpa. The monastery was established by the first Padtshaling Tulku Siddha Namgyal Lhendub in 1769, according to the prophecy of Lhasa Jowo.
- Drazhi or the Four Great Cliffs of Guru Rinpoche.
- Shuk Drak Goenpa, a cliff where Guru Rinpoche visited and meditated to acquire the spiritual power to subdue Shelging Karpo.
- Choedrak Monastery, a monastery built against the sacred cliff of Guru Rinpoche by Gyalwa Lorepa in the 12th century.
- Tang Rimochen Lhakhang, the holy site that has marks like tiger stripes, where Guru Rinpoche meditated and hid many treasures.
- Zhabjethang Lhakhang, a sacred plain where Guru Rinpoche and his consort Tashi Khyidren meditated and left their footprints. Later, a Lhakhang was built by Terton Dorji Lingpa in the 14th century.
- Kunzangdrak Monastery, a cliff where Pema Lingpa saw Kuntu Zangpo, one of the Primordial Buddhas while gazing up from his birthplace Chel and built a monastery in 1488.
- Thowadra Monastery, a high cliff of Guru Rinpoche where a wooden Garuda was left after exiling Khikha Rathoe from Khenpajong valley. The sacred site was founded by Mandarava.
- Tharpaling Monastery, the land of liberation.

== Notable towns ==
Bumthang also contains several notable towns:

- Chhumey
- Prakhar
- Jakar
- Tang Valley
- Ura

Annual Jakar Tshechus:

- Mid October (every year)

== Climate ==
Climate data for Bumthang (Jakar), elevation 2,470 m (8,100 ft), (1996–2017 normals)
Month	Jan	Feb	Mar	Apr	May	Jun	Jul	Aug	Sep	Oct	Nov	Dec	Year
Record high °C (°F)	18.5 (65.3)	20.0 (68.0)	23.0 (73.4)	24.0 (75.2)	25.5 (77.9)	28.0 (82.4)	27.0 (80.6)	27.0 (80.6)	26.5 (79.7)	24.0 (75.2)	22.0 (71.6)	19.0 (66.2)	28.0 (82.4)
Mean daily maximum °C (°F)	11.4 (52.5)	13.0 (55.4)	15.3 (59.5)	17.5 (63.5)	19.7 (67.5)	21.9 (71.4)	22.7 (72.9)	22.7 (72.9)	21.6 (70.9)	18.8 (65.8)	15.5 (59.9)	12.9 (55.2)	17.8 (63.9)
Daily mean °C (°F)	3.8 (38.8)	6.0 (42.8)	8.7 (47.7)	11.7 (53.1)	14.6 (58.3)	17.5 (63.5)	18.6 (65.5)	18.5 (65.3)	17.1 (62.8)	12.9 (55.2)	8.4 (47.1)	5.0 (41.0)	11.9 (53.4)
Mean daily minimum °C (°F)	−3.9 (25.0)	−1.1 (30.0)	2.1 (35.8)	5.9 (42.6)	9.5 (49.1)	13.0 (55.4)	14.4 (57.9)	14.2 (57.6)	12.5 (54.5)	7.0 (44.6)	1.3 (34.3)	−2.9 (26.8)	6.0 (42.8)
Record low °C (°F)	−13.0 (8.6)	−11.0 (12.2)	−7.0 (19.4)	−2.5 (27.5)	0.0 (32.0)	3.0 (37.4)	10.0 (50.0)	9.5 (49.1)	4.5 (40.1)	−5.0 (23.0)	−10.0 (14.0)	−13.5 (7.7)	−13.5 (7.7)
Average rainfall mm (inches)	5.9 (0.23)	10.6 (0.42)	34.2 (1.35)	66.6 (2.62)	94.4 (3.72)	97.6 (3.84)	155.9 (6.14)	138.7 (5.46)	89.1 (3.51)	57.3 (2.26)	6.9 (0.27)	1.9 (0.07)	759.1 (29.89)
Average rainy days	0.8	2.2	6.5	12.3	15.7	16.2	21.7	19.6	14.5	6.6	0.9	0.4	117.4
Average relative humidity (%)	72.3	70.5	68.7	69.6	70.7	73.4	77.6	78.0	75.5	72.0	68.5	73.1	72.5
Source 1: National Center for Hydrology and Meteorology
Source 2: World Meteorological Organization (rainy days 1996–2018)

Climate data for Ura, Bumthang District, elevation 3,090 m (10,140 ft), (1996–2017 normals)
Month	Jan	Feb	Mar	Apr	May	Jun	Jul	Aug	Sep	Oct	Nov	Dec	Year
Mean daily maximum °C (°F)	8.2 (46.8)	8.5 (47.3)	11.2 (52.2)	13.4 (56.1)	15.9 (60.6)	17.9 (64.2)	18.9 (66.0)	18.8 (65.8)	17.7 (63.9)	15.1 (59.2)	11.6 (52.9)	9.8 (49.6)	13.9 (57.1)
Daily mean °C (°F)	1.5 (34.7)	2.6 (36.7)	6.6 (43.9)	8.5 (47.3)	10.9 (51.6)	13.6 (56.5)	14.7 (58.5)	14.7 (58.5)	13.3 (55.9)	9.2 (48.6)	4.8 (40.6)	2.4 (36.3)	8.6 (47.4)
Mean daily minimum °C (°F)	−5.2 (22.6)	−3.3 (26.1)	2.0 (35.6)	3.5 (38.3)	5.9 (42.6)	9.3 (48.7)	10.4 (50.7)	10.6 (51.1)	8.9 (48.0)	3.2 (37.8)	−2.0 (28.4)	−5.0 (23.0)	3.2 (37.7)
Average rainfall mm (inches)	5.5 (0.22)	12.5 (0.49)	38.1 (1.50)	164.5 (6.48)	151.8 (5.98)	197.7 (7.78)	340.7 (13.41)	231.5 (9.11)	136.9 (5.39)	66.6 (2.62)	2.8 (0.11)	0.9 (0.04)	1,349.5 (53.13)
Average relative humidity (%)	57.6	69.0	69.8	76.4	75.9	80.2	83.7	81.5	76.3	69.4	62.2	56.4	71.5
Source: National Center for Hydrology and Meteorology

== See also ==
- Districts of Bhutan
- Bumthang Province
- Nangnang, Bhutan
- Thrumshing La
- Bumthang Tourism
