= Punakha District =

District of Bhutan

Punakha District སྤུ་ན་ཁ་རྫོང་ཁག
- District
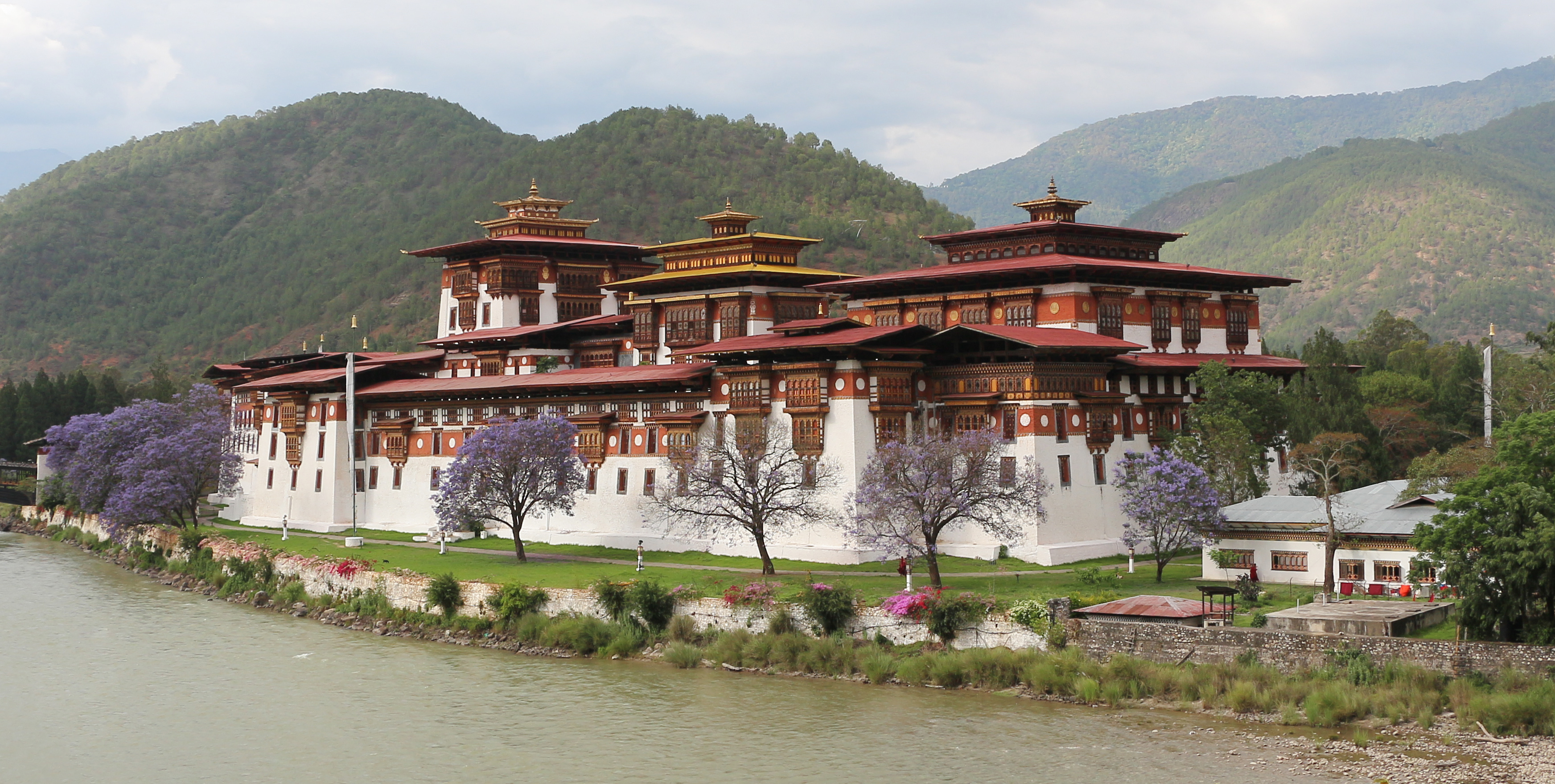
- Punakha Dzong along the Mo Chhu River

- Location of Punakha district within Bhutan
- Coordinates: 27°40′N 89°50′E
- Country: Bhutan
- Headquarters: Punakha

Area
  - Total: 1,110 km^{2} (430 sq mi)

Population (2017)
  - Total: 28,740
  - Density: 25.9/km^{2} (67.1/sq mi)
- Time zone: UTC+6 (BTT)
- HDI (2017): 0.654 medium · 7th
- Website: www.punakha.gov.bt

Punakha District (Dzongkha: སྤུ་ན་ཁ་རྫོང་ཁག་; Wylie: spu-na-kha rdzong-khag) is one of the 20 districts (dzongkhag) of Bhutan. It is bordered by Thimphu, Gasa, and Wangdue Phodrang Districts. The Punakha Dzong in Punakha serves as the administrative center of the district, and is one of the largest and oldest dzongs in the country. In 2017, Punakha district had a population of 28,740 inhabitants.

== Geography ==
Punakha district is one of the 20 districts (dzongkhag) of Bhutan. Spread over an area of 1,110 km^{2} (430 sq mi), It is situated in western Bhutan, and is bordered by the districts of Thimphu to the west, Gasa to the north, and Wangdue Phodrang to the east and south. The altitude varies from 1,100 to 2,500 m (3,600 to 8,200 ft) across the district. The Jigme Dorji National Park, established in 1974, and the second largest of the protected areas of Bhutan, covers parts of the district.

The Pho Chhu and Mo Chhu, two of the major rivers in Bhutan, join near Punakha to form the Puna Tsang Chhu river. Chubu Tshachu is a hot spring located at 1,737 m (5,699 ft) in Toewang Gewog in the district. The hot spring was supposedly discovered by Guru Rinpoche in the 8th century. Kabji-hoka Tsho, located at an altitude of 2,130 m (6,990 ft), is one of the largest freshwater lakes in Bhutan. The Punakha Suspension Bridge, about 7.5 km (4.7 mi) long, is the largest suspension bridge in the country, and connects Punakha to Chimi Lhakhang.

== Administration ==
Punakha is the seat of the district. The Punakha Dzong in Punakha is the administrative centre of the district. Located in the Punakha–Wangdue valley near the confluence of the Po Chhu and Mo Chhu rivers, it was constructed by Ngawang Namgyal in the early 17th century and is the second largest and oldest of the dzongs in Bhutan. The first National Assembly was held at the dzong in 1953, and the dzong served as the official center when Punakha served as the winter capital of Bhutan till 1955. It currently serves as the winter residence of Je Khenpo, the head of Dratshang Lhentshog.

Punakha district is divided into eleven gewogs (village blocks)–Barp, Chhubu, Dzomo, Goenshari, Guma, Kabjisa, Lingmukha, Shenga Bjime, Talog, Toepisa, and Toewang.

== Demographics and economy ==
In 2017, Punakha district had a population of 28,740 inhabitants of which 15,079 were males and 13,661 were females. About 25.6% of the population was below the age of six years. About three-fourth of the population was classified as rural. The economy is dependent on agriculture due to its favorable climate and soil conditions. Major crops include rice, wheat, maize, mustard, fruits such as citrus fruits, guava, peach, plum, pear, avocado, and apricot, and vegetables including radish, cabbage, tomato, egg plant, and chilli.

== Culture ==
The Punakha Dzong houses the several sacred Buddhist relics. It houses the Rangjung Kharsapani, considered to be a self-arisen image of Guru Rinpoche and a national treasure of Bhutan, and the remains of Ngawang Namgyal and Pema Lingpa. Other cultural and pilgrimage sites include Chimi Lhakhang, Khamsum Yulley Namgyal Choeten, Talo Monastery, and Goen Tshephu Ney.

Annual festivals held at the Punakha Dzong include Punakha Dromche, Punakha Drubchen, and Punakha Tshechu. The Punakha Dromche festival commemorates the Bhutanese resistance against the attacks of the Tibetan armies in the 17th-century. The Demchok Padma Vajra Dubchen is an annual ritual conducted to honour the dead.

== Gallery ==
Punakha District

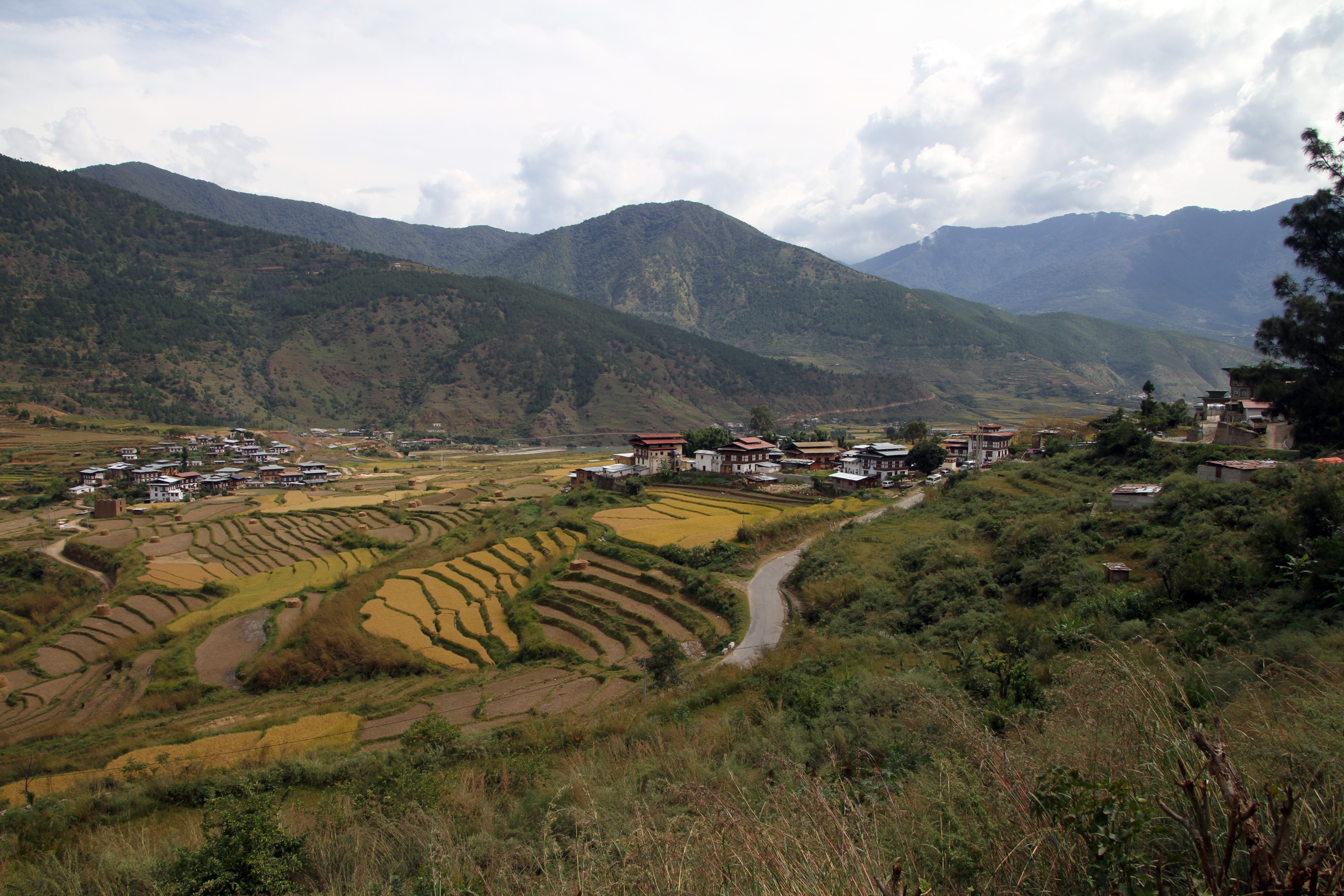
Punakha

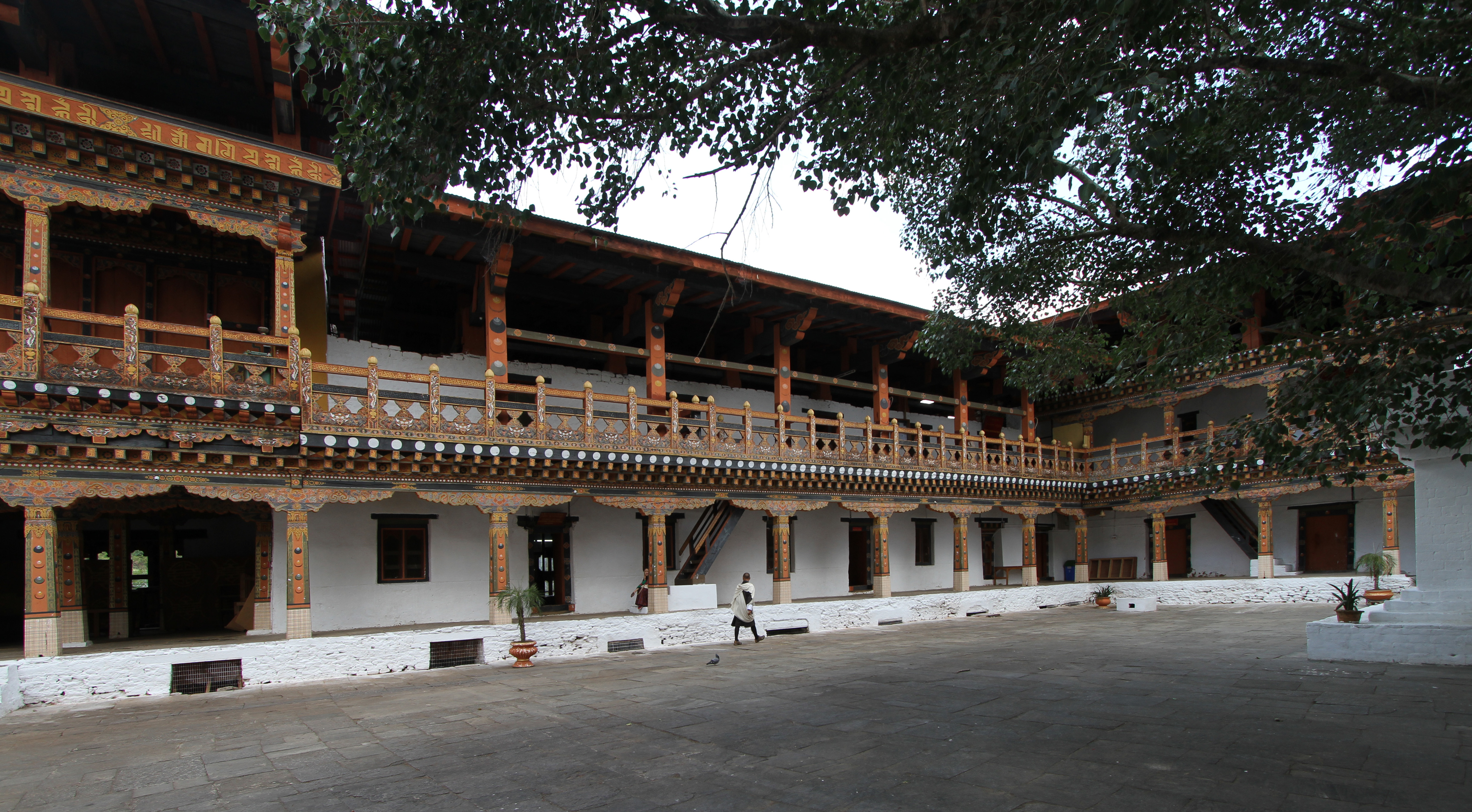
Punakha Dzong

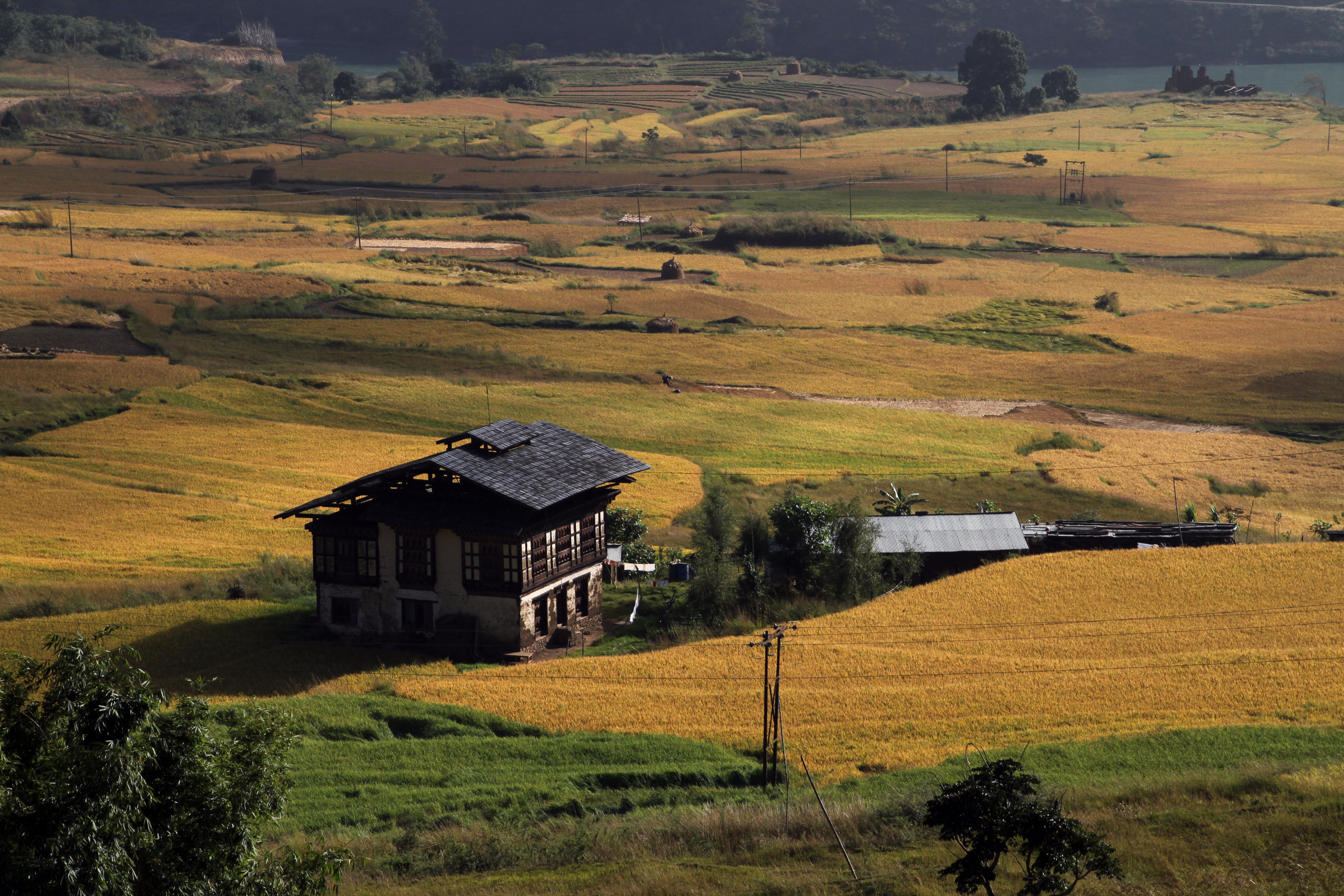
Lobesa

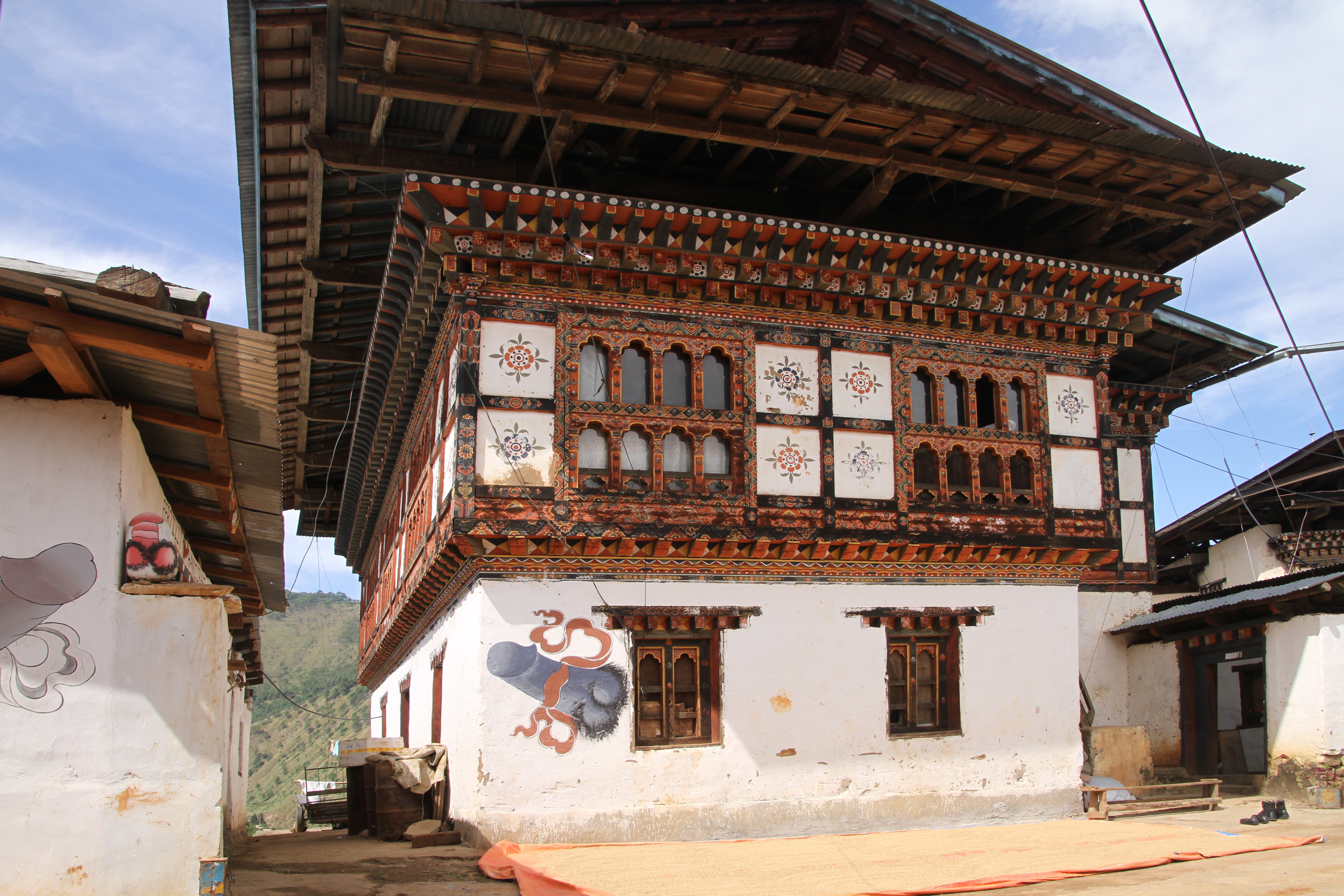
Sopsokha

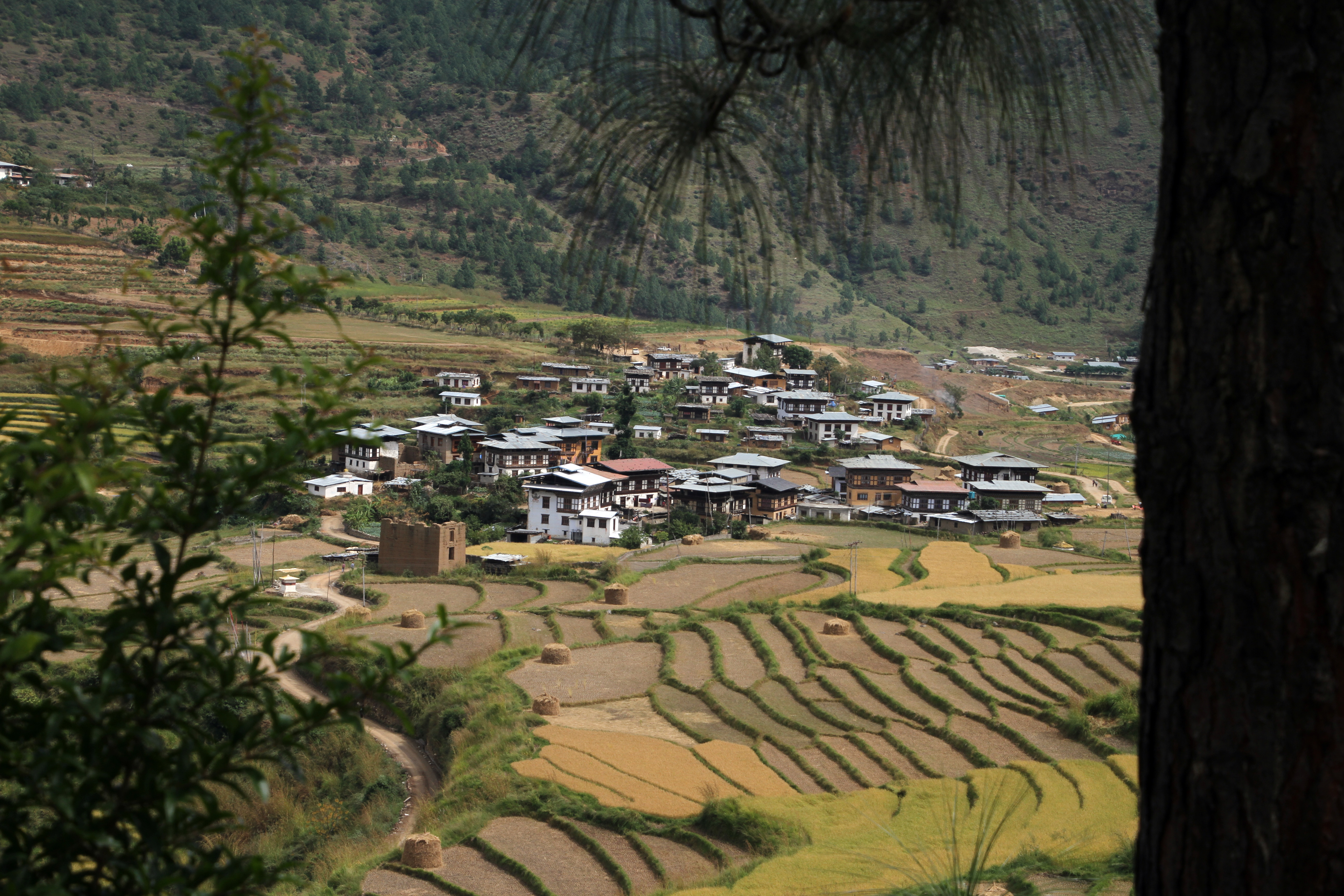
Yowakha

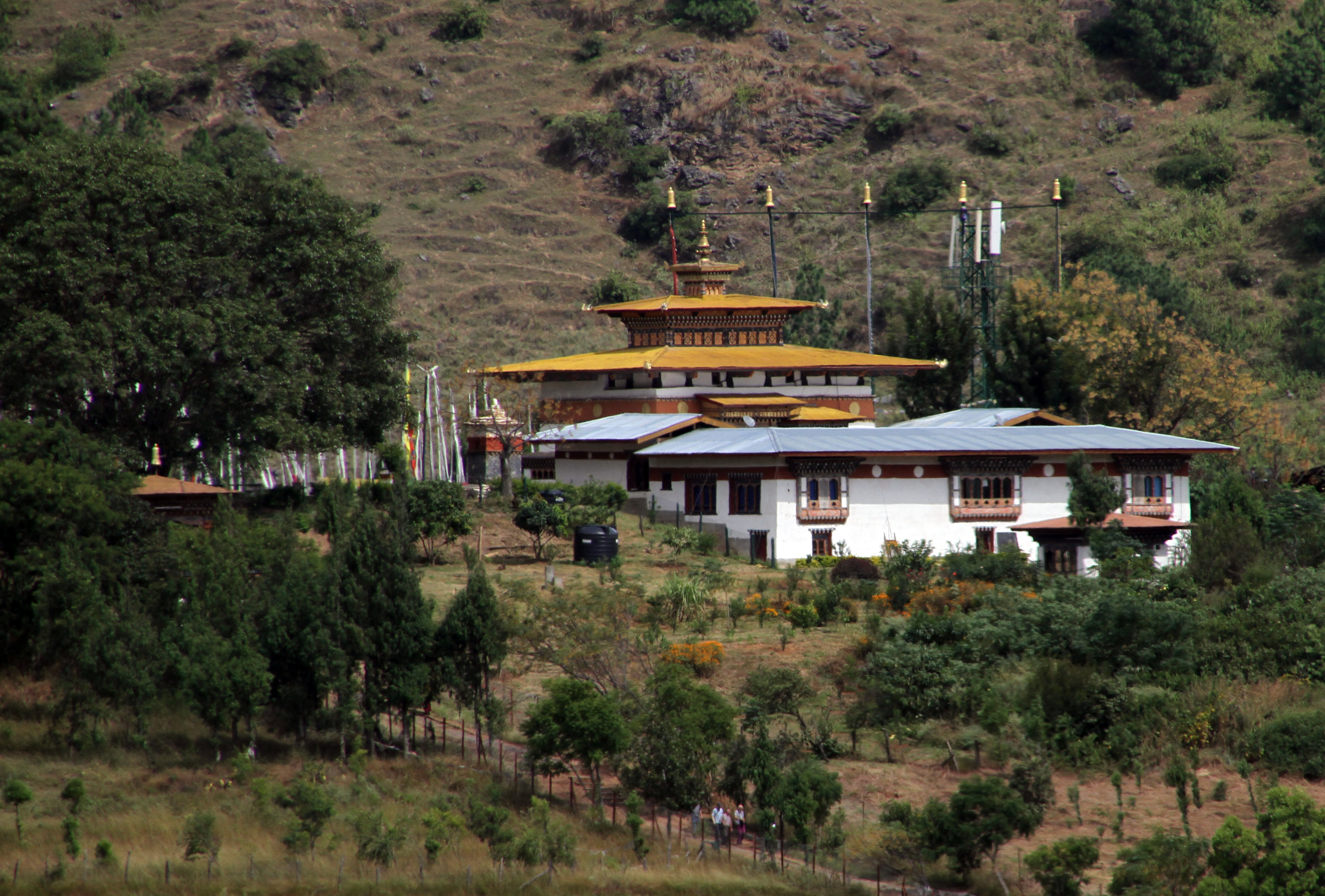
Chime Lhakhang

== See also ==
- Punakha Province
