= Kabjisa Gewog =

Kabisa Gewog དཀར་སྦི་ས་
- Gewog
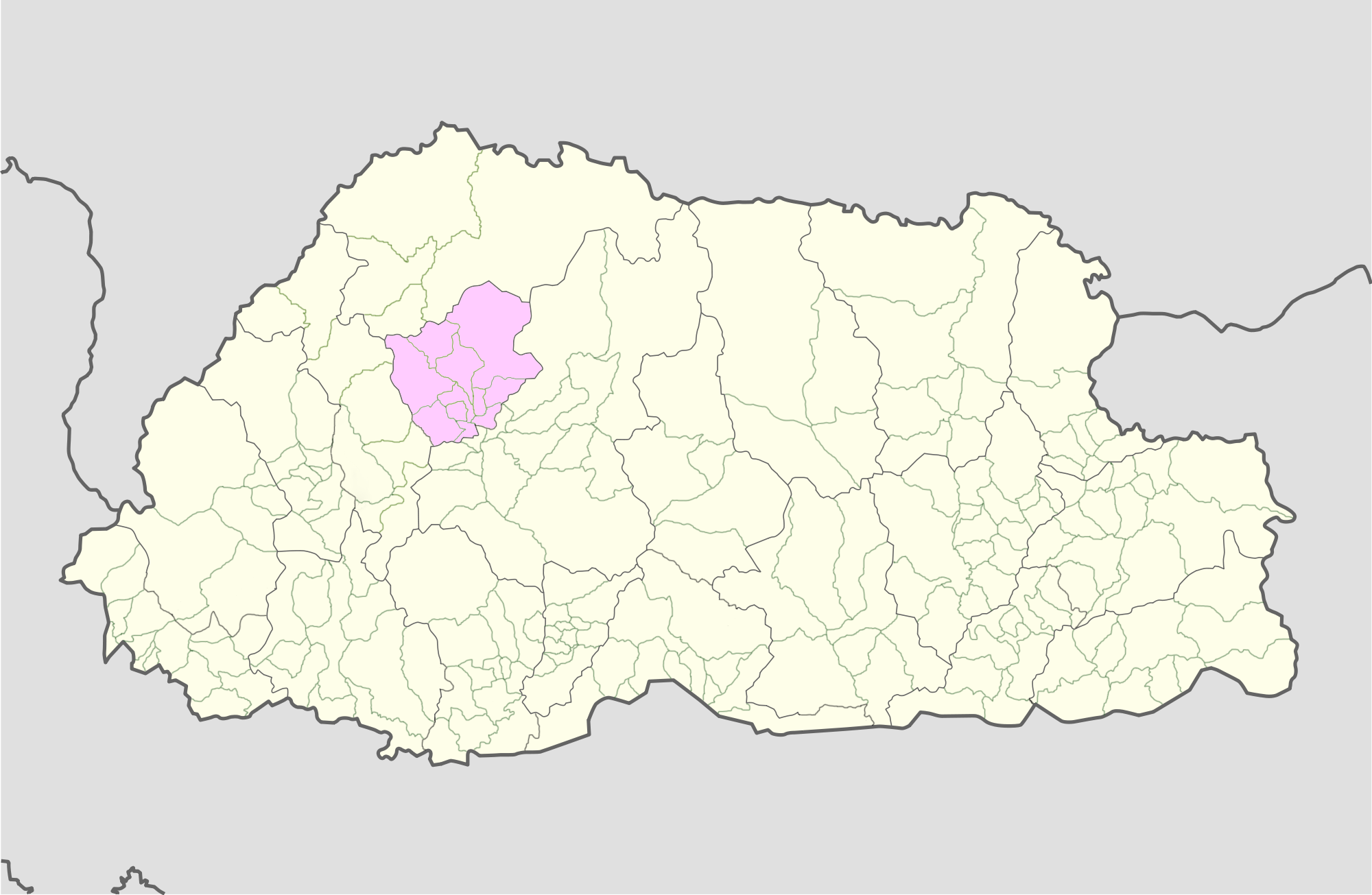
- Coordinates: 27°38′N 89°47′E
- Country: Bhutan
- District: Punakha District

Area
  - Total: 206.1 km^{2} (79.6 sq mi)

Population (2017)
  - Total: 2,542
- Time zone: UTC+6 (BTT)

Kabisa Gewog (Dzongkha: དཀར་སྦི་ས་རྒེད་འོག) is a gewog in Punakha District (dzongkhag), Bhutan. Spread over an area of 206.1 km^{2} (79.6 sq mi), it had a population of 2,542 in 2017.

== Geography ==
Kabjisa Gewog is one of the eleven gewogs in Punakha District (dzongkhag), Bhutan. It is spread over an area of 206.1 km^{2} (79.6 sq mi). It is located in the western part of the district and is bordered by Goenshari Gewog, Chhubu Gewog, Guma Gewog, and Toepisa Gewog.

The gewog is located along the Mo Chhu River, and was affected by flood in 2013. The gewog is located at altitudes ranging from 1,300 to 1,800 m (4,300 to 5,900 ft). It experiences a subtropical climate.

The gewog is divided into five chiwogs–Chhoeten Nyingpo-Uesarkha, Serigang-Wakoo Damchhi, Peltari, Heyloog-Tongzhoonang and Agonang-Zarbisa. The chiwogs are further subdivided into 39 villages.

== Demographics and economy ==
According to the 2017 Population and Housing Census of Bhutan, Kabjisa Gewog had a population of 2,542, comprising 1,296 males and 1,246 females. The gewog had 542 households, with an average household size of 4.3 people.

Due to its location along the Mo Chhu river, the gewog has fertile arable land where a variety of crops are grown. Approximately 528 acres (214 ha) of land was under rice cultivation and the gewog produced an estimated quantity of 1,045.44 t (1,152.40 tons) of rice in 2014. Major cash crops include sweet potato and orange. In 2021, the Government of Bhutan renovated the Hokatsho Irrigation Scheme located in Chhoeten Nyingpo village in the gewog, which was funded by the Green Climate Fund. The gewog has also been promoted as a tourist destination for adventure sports such as river rafting and canoeing.

The gewog has road connectivity and approximate 92% households have access to drinking water. It has one basic health unit, one outreach clinic, one renewable natural resources center, two extended classrooms, one middle school, one multi purpose hall and community centre. There are six lhakhangs in the gewog.
