= Chhubu Gewog =

Chhubu Gewog ཆུ་སྦུག་
- Gewog
- Country: Bhutan
- District: Punakha District

Area
  - Total: 91.3 km^{2} (35.3 sq mi)

Population (2017)
  - Total: 1,651
- Time zone: UTC+6 (BTT)

Chhubu Gewog (Dzongkha: ཆུ་སྦུག་) or Chhuboog Gewog, is a gewog in Punakha District (dzongkhag), Bhutan. Spread over an area of 91.3 km^{2} (35.3 sq mi), it had a population of 1,651 in 2017.

== Geography ==
Chhubu Gewog is one of the eleven gewogs in Punakha District (dzongkhag), Bhutan. Spread over an area of 91.3 km^{2} (35.3 sq mi), it is one of the largest gewogs by area in the district. It is located in the central part of the district and is bordered by Goenshari Gewog to the northwest, Kabjisa Gewog to the west, Guma Gewog to the southwest, Dzomi Gewog to the south, and Toewang Gewog to the east. It is bound by the Pho Chhu and the Mo Chhu rivers. Part of the gewog is occupied by the Jigme Dorji National Park.

The gewog is divided into five chiwogs–Yebisa, Jangwakha-Sewala, Bali, Bumtakha-Tenpakha and Ngoe-droob-chhu. The chiwogs are further subdivided into 20 villages.

== Demographics and economy ==
According to the 2017 Population and Housing Census of Bhutan, Chhubu Gewog had a population of 1,651, comprising 916 males and 735 females. The gewog had 313 households, with an average household size of 4.3 people.

The gewog has limited cultivable land. Rice and wheat are the major crops cultivated in the gewog, while mandarin oranges are also grown. Agriculture is often dependent on rainfall. The Bhutan Trust Fund for Environmental Conservation funded a solar based water-pumping system to transfer water from the Mo Chhu to the existing irrigation channels. The inhabitants of the gewog engage in trade and commerce with other neighbouring gewogs.

The gewog has three outreach clinics providing primary healthcare services to rural areas. There is one primary school in Nawakha and two extended classrooms in the gewog. The gewog also has three suspension bridges. Approximately 99% of households have access to clean drinking water. The Domakhey Water Project was launched in 2021 to supply water to 110 households.
