= Shenga Bjime Gewog =

Shenga Bjemi Gewog ཤེལ་རྔ་ན-སྦྱེ་མི་
- Gewog
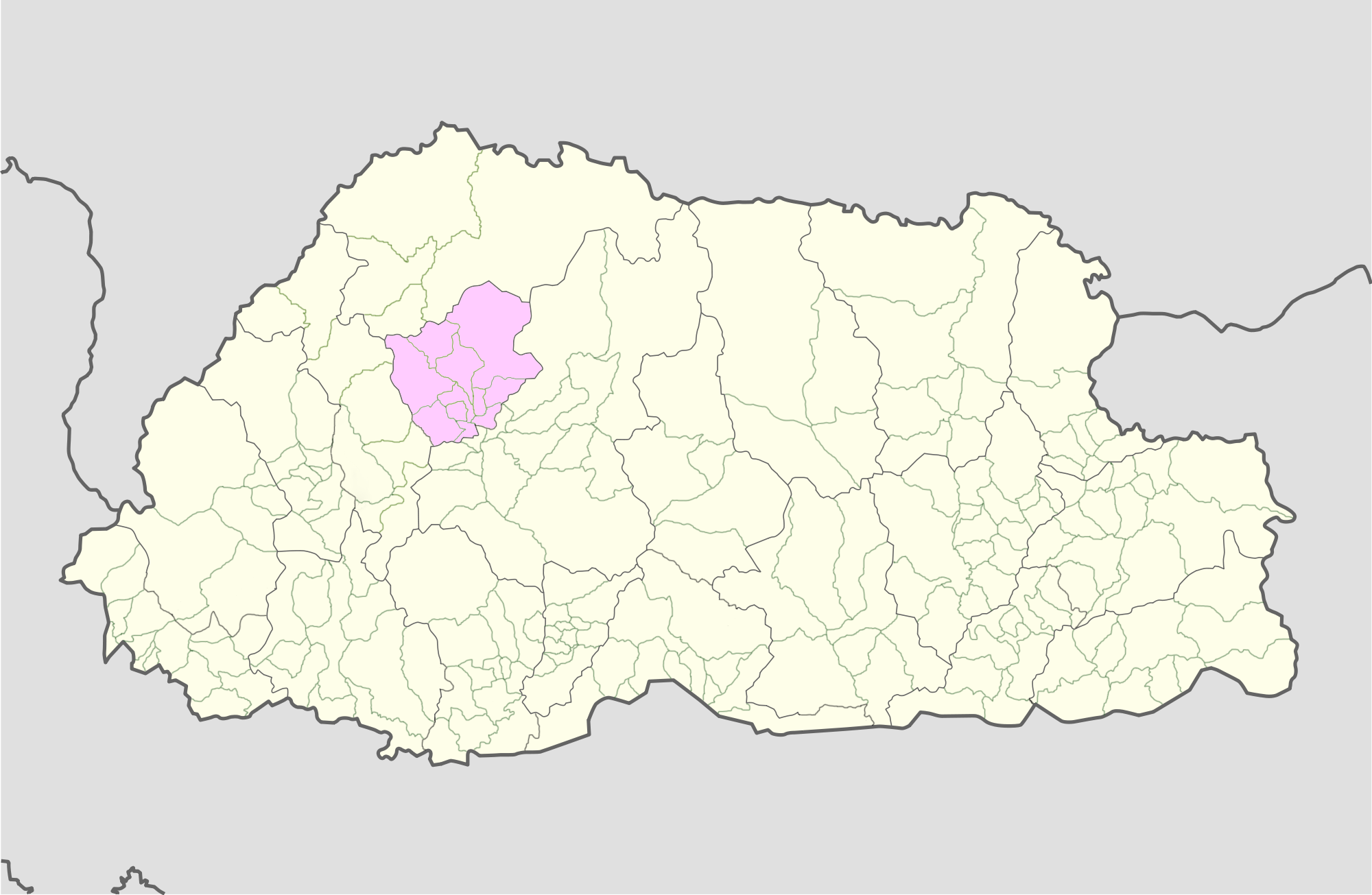
- Coordinates: 27°36′N 89°55′E
- Country: Bhutan
- District: Punakha District

Area
  - Total: 62.43 km^{2} (24.10 sq mi)

Population (2017)
  - Total: 1,003
- Time zone: UTC+6 (BTT)

Shenga Bjemi Gewog (Dzongkha: ཤེལ་རྔ་ན-སྦྱེ་མི་རྒེད་འོག) is a gewog in Punakha District (dzongkhag), Bhutan. Spread over an area of 62.43 km^{2} (24.10 sq mi), it had a population of 1,003 in 2017.

== Geography ==
Shenga Bjemi Gewog is one of the eleven gewogs in Punakha District (dzongkhag), Bhutan. It is spread over an area of 62.43 km^{2} (24.10 sq mi). It is located in the southeastern part of the district and is bordered by Toewang Gewog in the north, Lingmukha Gewog and Wangdue Phodrang District in the south, and Dzomi Gewog in the west.

The gewog is situated on the eastern bank of the Pho Chhu River. It has altitudes ranging from 1,480 to 3,800 m (4,860 to 12,470 ft). The gewog experiences warm and humid summers with maximum temperature of 30 °C (86 °F) and dry and cold winters. Approximately 60% of the land area is covered by forests, and the remaining 40% consists of arable lands.

The gewog is divided into five chiwogs–Datong, Chongzhi-Jarigang-Jazhikha, Khubji-Tshosa, Gangkha and Thongji. The chiwogs are further subdivided into 40 villages.

== Demographics and economy ==
According to the 2017 Population and Housing Census of Bhutan, Shenga Bjemi Gewog had a population of 1,003, comprising 522 males and 481 females. The gewog had 239 households, with an average household size of 3.7 people. Approximately 95% of the households had access to clean drinking water.

Rice is the major crop grown in the gewog. Approximately 712 acres (288 ha) of land was under rice cultivation and the gewog produced an estimated quantity of 1,480.96 t (1,632.48 tons) of rice in 2014. Zhung-ngo Zaw is a traditional rice dish prepared during festivals, community events, and religious rituals. Other crops grown include other cereals and vegetables. People also rear local-bred cattle.

The gewog one basic health unit, one renewable natural resources center, one lower secondary school, one multi purpose hall and four temples.
