= Tarina Tsho =

Lake in Bhutan

- Tarina
- Location within Bhutan
- Location: Gasa District
- Coordinates: 28°06′22″N 89°53′55″E
- Primary outflows: Pho Chhu

Tarina Tsho (Tsho: lake) is one of the lakes of Bhutan that is a major contributor to GLOF danger in the country. It was the source of the 1983 GLOF that destroyed part of Punakha Dzong.
