= Toepisa Gewog =

Toepisa Gewog སཏོད་པའི་ས་
- Gewog
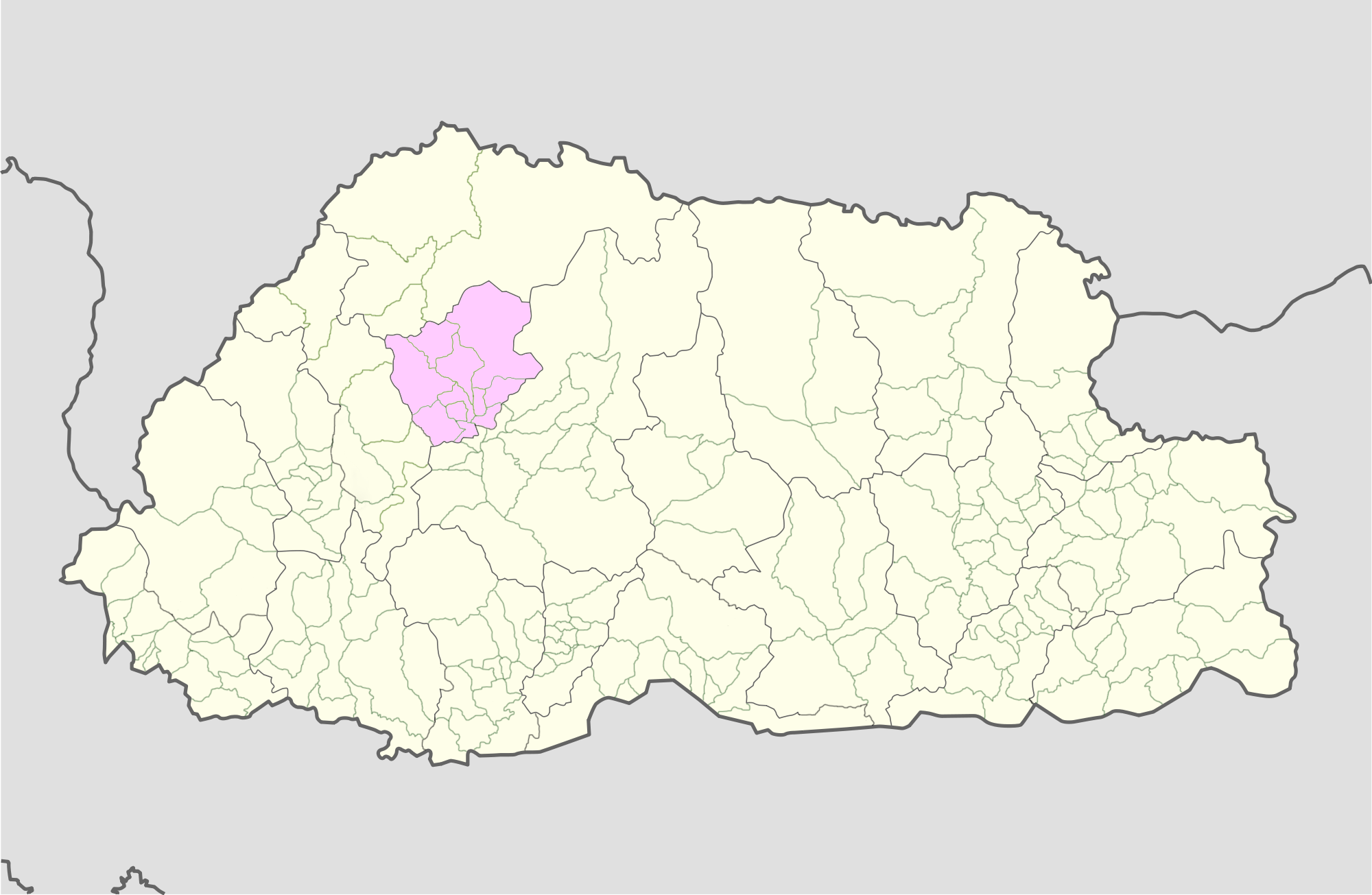
- Coordinates: 27°32′N 89°48′E
- Country: Bhutan
- District: Punakha District

Area
  - Total: 102.8 km^{2} (39.7 sq mi)

Population (2017)
  - Total: 2,427
- Time zone: UTC+6 (BTT)

Toepisa Gewog (Dzongkha: སྟོད་པའི་ས་རྒེད་འོག) is a gewog in Punakha District (dzongkhag), Bhutan. Spread over an area of 102.8 km^{2} (39.7 sq mi), it had a population of 2,427 in 2017.

== Geography ==
Toepisa Gewog is one of the eleven gewogs in Punakha District (dzongkhag), Bhutan. Spread over an area of 102.8 km^{2} (39.7 sq mi), the gewog was merged with Punakha District from Thimphu District on 15 January 2008. It is located in the southwest corner of the district and is bordered by Kabjisa Gewog to the northwest, Guma and Talo Gewogs to the northeast, and Barp Gewog to the east.

The gewog is located at an altitude ranging from 1,709 to 3,200 m (5,607 to 10,499 ft). It lies in a subtropical climate zone and experiences hot and humid summers and cold winters. It receives most of the precipitation during the monsoon season. The vegetation consists of mostly chir pine forests (92%), with the remaining made up other conifers and broadleaf forest.

The gewog is divided into five chiwogs– Bichhekha-Yuelhamo, Damkhyi-Rinekha, Dochogla-Maenchhuna, Lemjakha-Thinleygang and Goenmkha-Mendrelgang. The chiwogs are further subdivided into 26 villages.

== Demographics and economy ==
According to the 2017 Population and Housing Census of Bhutan, Toepisa Gewog had a population of 2,427, comprising 1,282 males and 1,145 females. The gewog had 526 households, with an average household size of 3.4 people. All the households have access to electricity and approximately 96% of the households had access to drinking water.

Rice is the major crop in the gewog. Other agricultural crops include wheat, maize, barley, mustard, asparagus, and potato. The East-West Highway passes through the gewog and helps in marketing the agricultural produce. In 2020, the gewog administration constructed temporary market sheds at Bjichulum to move vendors away from the roadside along the Thimphu–Punakha highway. However, the vendors moved out of the market because of poor patronage of customers and returned to selling their produce along the highway.
