= Toewang Gewog =

Toewang Gewog སྟོད་ཝང་
- Gewog
- Coordinates: 27°39′N 89°52′E
- Country: Bhutan
- District: Punakha District

Area
  - Total: 415.65 km^{2} (160.48 sq mi)

Population (2017)
  - Total: 1,313
- Time zone: UTC+6 (BTT)

Toewang Gewog (Dzongkha: སྟོད་ཝང་རྒེད་འོག) is a gewog in Punakha District (dzongkhag), Bhutan. Spread over an area of 415.65 km^{2} (160.48 sq mi), it is the largest gewog by area in the district. According to the 2024 census, it had a population of 1,313 inhabitants.

== Geography ==
Toewang Gewog is one of the eleven gewogs in Punakha District (dzongkhag), Bhutan. Spread over an area of 415.65 km^{2} (160.48 sq mi), it is the largest gewog by area in the district. It is located in the northeastern part of the district and is bordered by Dzomi and Shenga Bjime Gewogs to the south, and Goenshari and Chhubu Gewogs to the west.

The gewog is located at an altitude ranging from 1,250 to 3,700 m (4,100 to 12,140 ft). It experiences warm and humid summers and cool winters. Chubu Tshachhu is a hot spring in Toewang Gewog, though it has limited infrastructure facilities.

The gewog is divided into five chiwogs–Tsephug-Khawakha, Jibjo-Yusakha, Kewanang-Tshachchuphu, Tamig Tamigdamchhu-Thangbji and Dawakha. The chiwogs are further subdivided into 37 villages.

== Demographics ==
According to the 2017 Population and Housing Census of Bhutan, Dzomi Gewog had a population of 1,313, comprising 620 males and 693 females. The gewog had 305 households, with an average household size of 4.1 people. Approximately 91% of households have access to clean drinking water.

== Economy ==
Agriculture and animal husbandry are important economic activities in the gewog. Rice and wheat are the major crops. The Pangtse Makhu is a traditional cooking oil produced in the gewog. The oil is produced from the seeds of the Pangtse tree. The traditional production process involves collecting, crushing and drying the fruits, then heating the crushed seeds, and extracting the oil from the seeds using a wooden presses.

The gewog has about 42.9 km (26.7 mi) of roads. There is a primary school, a basic health unit, a outreach clinic, a renewable natural resources center, and a multipurpose hall and community centre among its facilities. There are seven Lhakhangs.
