= Guma Gewog =

Guma Gewog གུ་མ་
- Gewog
- Coordinates: 27°34′N 89°52′E
- Country: Bhutan
- District: Punakha District

Area
  - Total: 37 km^{2} (14 sq mi)

Population (2017)
  - Total: 2,752
- Time zone: UTC+6 (BTT)

Guma Gewog (Dzongkha: གུ་མ་རྒེད་འོག) is a gewog in Punakha District (dzongkhag), Bhutan. Spread over an area of 37 km^{2} (14 sq mi), it had a population of 2,752 in 2017.

== Geography ==
Guma Gewog is one of the eleven gewogs in Punakha District (dzongkhag), Bhutan. It is spread over an area of 37 km^{2} (14 sq mi). It is located in the southcentral part of the district and is bordered by Barp Gewog to the south, Talo Gewog to the southwest, Kabjisa Gewog to the northwest, Chhubu Gewog to the north, Dzomi Gewog to the east, and Lingmukha Gewog to the southeast. The gewog is located along the Mo Chhu river, and is the most prone to floods amongst all the gewogs in the province. It is located approximately 2 km (1.2 mi) from the administrative centre of the Punakha Dzongkhag.

The gewog is located at an altitude ranging from 1,200 to 2,200 m (3,900 to 7,200 ft). It is located in a subtropical climate zone. Summers are hot, with temperatures reaching 32 °C (90 °F). Winters are dry and windy with temperatures of 12 to 19 °C (54 to 66 °F). The gewog receives an annual precipitation of 500 to 1,500 mm (20 to 59 in), and most of the rainfall occurs during the monsoon season from June to August. The vegetation consists of chir pine at lower elevations and mixed warm broadleaf forest at higher elevations.

The gewog is divided into five chiwogs:Guma-Wolakha, Changyul-Loongsilgang-Tashijong, Baymenang-Phulingsoom-Wanghwakha, Dochhukha-Dzomlingthang-Ritsha, and Lakhu-Tshowogm.

== Demographics ==
According to the 2017 Population and Housing Census of Bhutan, Dzomi Gewog had a population of 2,752, comprising 1,454 males and 1,298 females. The gewog had 588 households, with an average household size of 3.8 people.

The gewog hosts the Dzongkhag veterinary hospital, one hospital, one outreach clinic, several schools, a multipurpose hall and community center. All households have access to drinking water and all the villages have road access.

== Economy ==
Agriculture and animal husbandry are the major economic activities in the gewog. Rice is the principal crop in the gewog. Other crops include maize, vegetables including chilli pepper, spinach, radish, potato, brinjal, turnip, and onion, and fruits including orange, banana, pear, and walnut. In 2026, the government constructed a solar powered lift irrigation system to address water shortage in the gewog. The system, funded by the Government of India, is designed to pump water from the Mo Chhu river to the irrigation channels.

Other occupation includes livestock breeding wherein local farmers rear local and imported breeds of livestock, including Jersey cattle and Mithun, apart from poultry and pigs. Khuruthang town, located in the gewog, serves as a main market for agricultural and livestock produce.
