= Tang Chuu =

Location
- Country: Bhutan

Physical characteristics
- Mouth
  - location: Mo Chhu

Basin features
- River system: Mo Chhu
- Tributaries
  - left: Yenyer Chhu

The Tang Chuu is a tributary of the Mo Chhu in western Bhutan.

== Course ==
It originates in the Himalayas near Thowadra Gompa. It receives numerous hill streams, including the Yenyer Chhu. It joins the Mo Chhu, which later takes on the name of Sankosh, at Wangdi Phodrang.

== Bumthang ==
There are four major valleys in the Bumthang region: Chokhor, Tang, Ura and Chhume.

Tang is the most remote of Bumthang’s valleys. It is at a higher altitude than Chokhor. The poor soil does not support much agriculture but people in the valley raise sheep, and higher up the mountains yaks. When buckwheat flowers bloom in October, the valley turns bright pink. Farmhouses are scattered in the valley and on the hills. Gamling is a wealthy village, with wonderful wall paintings. It is well known for yathra weaving, a method of weaving with wool unique to the Bumthang area.

== The Burning Lake ==
A picturesque pool in the Tang Chuu is known as Membartsho (Burning Lake). Pema Lingpa found many of Guru Rinpoche’s terma here. He was guided in a dream to the place where the river forms a large pool resembling a lake. On seeing a temple in the water he dived in and returned with a treasure. The next time he came he was followed by a big crowd with many sceptics. Forced to prove himself he took a lighted lamp in his hand and proclaimed that if he was false he would die but if he was true he would return with the lighted lamp. He returned with a statue, a treasure chest and the lamp still burning. The pool came to be known as Membartso or the Burning Lake.

== Fishing ==
The Tang Chuu is famous for trout fishing. It is one of the best outdoor fishing spots in the area.

== Sources ==
- TANG VALLEY
