= Dzomi Gewog =

Dzomi Gewog འཅོམས་མི་
- Gewog
- Coordinates: 27°35′22″N 89°52′24″E
- Country: Bhutan
- District: Punakha District

Area
  - Total: 21.92 km^{2} (8.46 sq mi)

Population (2017)
  - Total: 2,147
- Time zone: UTC+6 (BTT)

Dzomi Gewog (Dzongkha: འཛོམས་མི་རྒེད་འོག) is a gewog in Punakha District (dzongkhag), Bhutan. Spread over an area of 21.92 km^{2} (8.46 sq mi), it had a population of 2,147 in 2017.

== Geography ==
Dzomi Gewog is one of the eleven gewogs in Punakha District (dzongkhag), Bhutan. Spread over an area of 21.92 km^{2} (8.46 sq mi), it is the smallest gewog by area in the district. It is located in the southcentral part of the district and is bordered by Lingmukha Gewog to the south, Shenga Bjime Gewog to the east, Toewang Gewog to the northeast, Chhubu Gewog to the northwest, and Guma Gewog to the west. The gewog is situated near the Pho Chhu River and is affected by flash floods due to glacial lake outburst. The gewog is located at an altitude ranging from 1,200 to 2,400 m (3,900 to 7,900 ft).

The gewog is divided into five chiwogs–Gubji Tseykakha, Khilikhar Loongkha, Tanag Uesa, Dzomisa Mendagang and Jimithang. The chiwogs are further subdivided into 19 villages.

== Demographics and economy ==
According to the 2017 Population and Housing Census of Bhutan, Dzomi Gewog had a population of 2,147, comprising 1,036 males and 1,111 females. The gewog had 395 households, with an average household size of 4.2 people.

Agriculture is the major economic activity in the gewog. The main crops include rice, wheat, mustard, and horticultural crops. It is part of one of the major rice producing areas of Bhutan. In 2021, the Government of Bhutan implemented a plan for the renovation of the Jimithang Irrigation Scheme in the gewog, which was funded by the Green Climate Fund with technical support from the United Nations Development Programme. Other occupation include animal husbandry wherein local farmers rear local and imported breeds of livestock, including Jersey cattle and Mithun, apart from poultry and pigs. It is connected to nearby town of Khuruthang, which allows residents to market their agricultural and livestock produce.
