= Ura Monastery =

Buddhist monastery in Bumthang, Bhutan

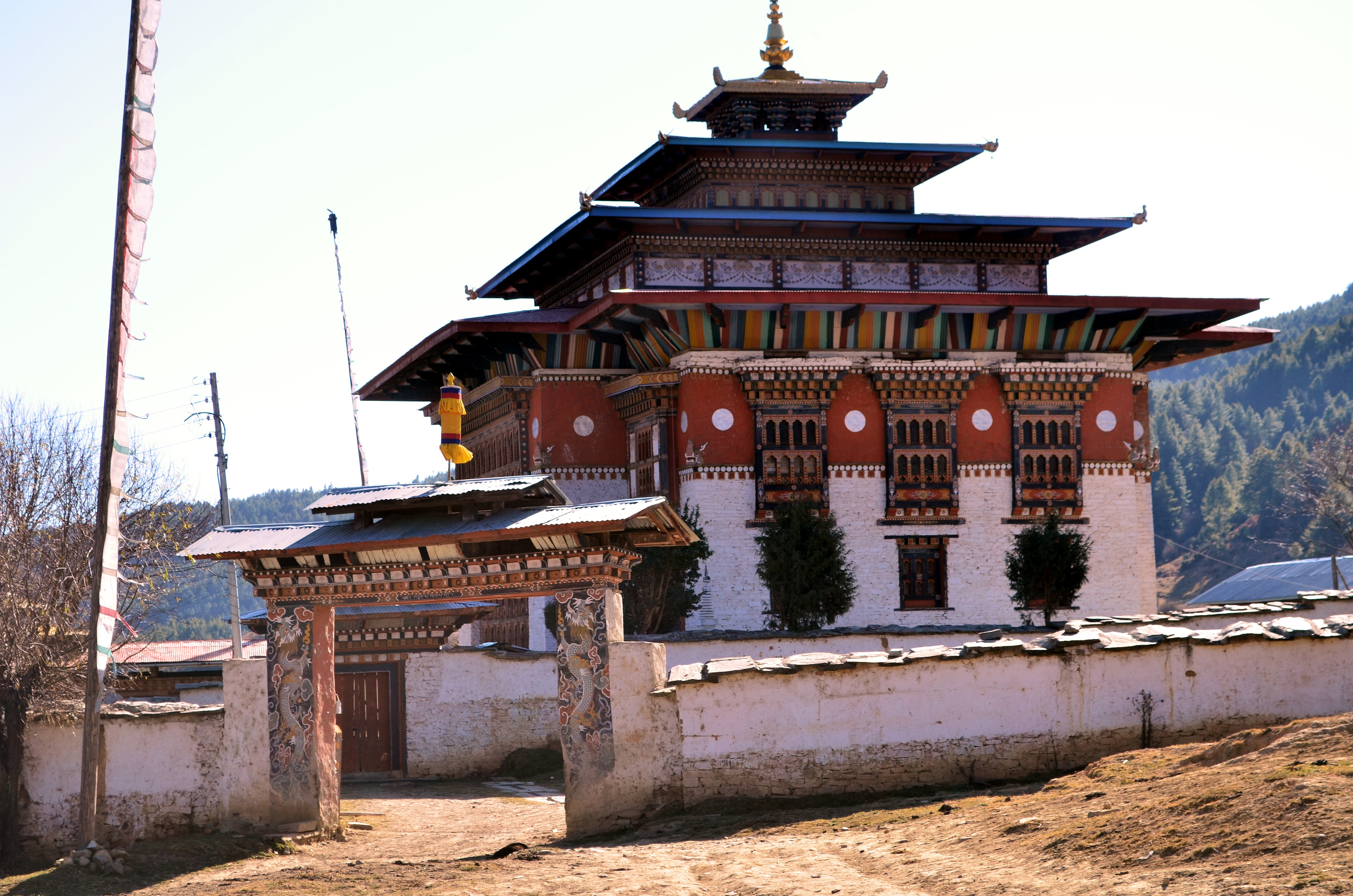

- Location within Bhutan

Religion
- Affiliation: Tibetan Buddhism

Location
- Location: Bhutan
- Country: Bhutan
- Interactive map of Ura Monastery
- Coordinates: 27°28′38″N 90°54′11″E

Ura Monastery is a Buddhist monastery in Bhutan.

The Ura Lhakhang is situated in the middle of Ura village in Bumthang. The temple is about the size of the National library at Kawajangsa Thimphu. It was built in the 1986 on the site of an old temple which was in a bad condition. It is a two-storey temple constructed in a traditional Bhutanese style and is dedicated to Guru Rimpoche, it also houses three sanctuaries. Inside is a huge statue of Guru Rimpoche and beautiful paintings. Guru Nangsay Zilnoen is the main statue.
