= Goenshari Gewog =

Goenshari Gewog དགོམ་ཤ་རི་
- Gewog
- Country: Bhutan
- District: Punakha District

Area
  - Total: 88.4 km^{2} (34.1 sq mi)

Population (2017)
  - Total: 694
- Time zone: UTC+6 (BTT)

Goenshari Gewog (Dzongkha: དགོན་ཤ་རི་རྒེད་འོག)is a gewog in Punakha District (dzongkhag), Bhutan. Spread over an area of 88.94 km^{2} (34.34 sq mi), it had a population of 88.4 in 2017. Despite being one of the largest gewogs by land area, it is the least populated gewog in the district.

== Geography ==
Goenshari Gewog is one of the eleven gewogs in Punakha District (dzongkhag), Bhutan. Spread over an area of 88.4 km^{2} (34.1 sq mi), it is one of the largest gewogs by area in the district. It is located in the northwestern corner of the district and is bordered by Toewang Gewog to the east, Chhubu Gewog to the south, and Kabjisa Gewog to the west.

The altitude ranges from 1,400 to 4,000 m (4,600 to 13,100 ft) in the gewog. It experiences a subtropical climate with warm and humid summers and cold winters. The average temperature ranges from 4 to 30 °C (39 to 86 °F). The gewog receives an annual rainfall of 500 to 1,500 mm (20 to 59 in).

Part of the gewog falls under the jurisdiction of the Jigme Dorji National Park, which supports several species of biodiversity. Approximately 90% of the land area of the gewog is covered by forests, of which broadleaf forests contribute to 70% of the land area and the remaining 20% is covered by coniferous forests. About five percent of the land area consists of agricultural lands, and the remaining land is made up of pastures and shrub forests. The gewog is home to the Koma Tsachu hot spring. According to local traditions, the hot spring, located at an altitude of 1,839 m (6,033 ft), was blessed by Guru Rinpoche in the eighth century, and is promoted as a cure for skeletal and muscular ailments.

The gewog is divided into five chiwogs–Goomgang, Yorbo, Zhelngoesa, Draagchhukha and Sechaed-Nang. The chiwogs are further subdivided into six villages.

== Demographics and economy ==
According to the 2017 Population and Housing Census of Bhutan, Goenshari Gewog had a population of 694, comprising 413 males and 281 females. It is the least populated gewog in the district. The gewog had 145 households, with an average household size of 3.6 people.

The gewog has a predominantly sandy and loamy soil with a high humus content. Major agricultural produce include rice and wheat. Other crops grown include vegetables including chilli pepper, radish, turnip, and potato. Edible flowers, including cornflowers and calendula, are grown in Dragchhukha chiwog. Other occupation includes animal husbandry wherein local farmers rear local and imported breeds of livestock, including Jersey and Swiss cattle, Mithun, apart from poultry and pigs.

The highway connecting Punakha and Gasa runs through the district. However, most of the inhabited villages are located further away from the road and are accessible only by foot. There are two suspension bridges in the gewog. The gewog has one primary school, one outreach Clinic, a multipurpose hall and community centre. All the households have access to clean drinking water.
