= Talo Monastery =

Buddhist Monastery in Punakha District, Bhutan

Religion
- Affiliation: Tibetan Buddhism
- Festival: see Talo festival

Location
- Location: Bhutan
- Country: Bhutan
- Interactive map of Talo Monastery

Talo Monastery (Tibetan: ༼རྟ་ལོག་དགོན་པ༽) is a three-story Buddhist monastery located on the hills above Punakha at an elevation of 2800 m (9200 ft). It is the most important and sacred monastery in Bhutan since it is directly connected to the successive mind manifestations of Zhabdrung Ngawang Namgyal. It is commonly known as Talo Goenpa or Talo Sangngak Choling Monastery.

It was founded by Chogtul Jigme Singye, the fourth reincarnation of Lam Thripa, in 1767.

== Talo festival ==
The Talo festival takes place in the village of Talo at Talo Monastery, approximately one hour drive from Punakha and situated at an elevation of 2800 meters, or approximately 9200 feet. The three-day festival is particularly popular for its mask and atsara dances. Indigenous to this festival is the classical dance (Zungdra) by Talo dance group. The three songs of Mani Sum, which includes the Zungdra set is performed at the end of each day. The festival, besides its religious significance, is an opportunity for villagers and families to come together and celebrate.
