= Barp Gewog =

Barp Gewog བརཔ་
- Gewog
- Coordinates: 27°31′N 89°52′E
- Country: Bhutan
- District: Punakha District

Area
  - Total: 24.65 km^{2} (9.52 sq mi)

Population (2017)
  - Total: 5,726
- Time zone: UTC+6 (BTT)

Barp Gewog (Dzongkha: བརཔ་རྒེད་འོག) is a gewog in Punakha District (dzongkhag), Bhutan. Spread over an area of 24.65 km^{2} (9.52 sq mi), it had a population of 5,726 in 2017. The Chimi Lhakhang, also known as the Fertility Temple, is located near Sopsokha in the gewog.

== Geography ==
Barp Gewog is one of the eleven gewogs in Punakha District (dzongkhag), Bhutan. Spread over an area of 24.65 km^{2} (9.52 sq mi), it is the second smallest gewog by area in the district. The gewog is located approximately 12 km (7.5 mi) from the administrative center of the Punakha Dzongkhag. It is located in the southern part of the district and is bordered by Toepisa Gewog to the west, Talo, guma, and Lingmukha Gewogs to the north.

The gewog is located at an elevation ranging from 1,400 to 1,800 m (4,600 to 5,900 ft) above sea level. Located in the subtropical region, it experiences a hot and humid climate in the summer and mild winters. The average daily temperature ranges from 5 to 30 °C (41 to 86 °F). The gewog receives an annual rainfall of 500 to 1,500 mm (20 to 59 in). It receives most of the rainfall during the monsoon season from June to August.

The gewog is divided into five chiwogs: Tshokorna, Chasa, Eusakha, Euwakha and Gamakha. The chiwogs are further subdivided into 25 villages.

== Demographics and economy ==
As of 2017, Barp gewog had a population of 5,726 including 2,937 males and 2,789 females. The gewog had the highest number of households in the district, and the average household size was recorded as 3.5. About 4,942 inhabitants were classified as rural, and the remaining urban population of 784 resided in the town of Lobesa.

There is a primary healthcare center at Lobesa. There is a lower secondary school at Lobesa and an autonomous school at Dashiding. About 99.5% of the households in the gewog had access to drinking water.

Agriculture is an important economic activity in the gewog. Rice is the major crop, and other agricultural produce include wheat, fruits, and vegetables.

== Culture ==
Chimi Lhakhang, also known as the Fertility Temple, is a Buddhist monastery located near Sopsokha. It houses a wooden phallus, which is used to bless women. It was built in 1499 by Ngawang Choegyal on the site where the Buddhist saint Drukpa Kunley (1455–1529), popularly known as the Divine Madman, had built a chorten.
