= Punakha Dzong =

Fortress in Punakha, Bhutan

Punakha Dzong Pungthang Dechen Phodrang Dzong
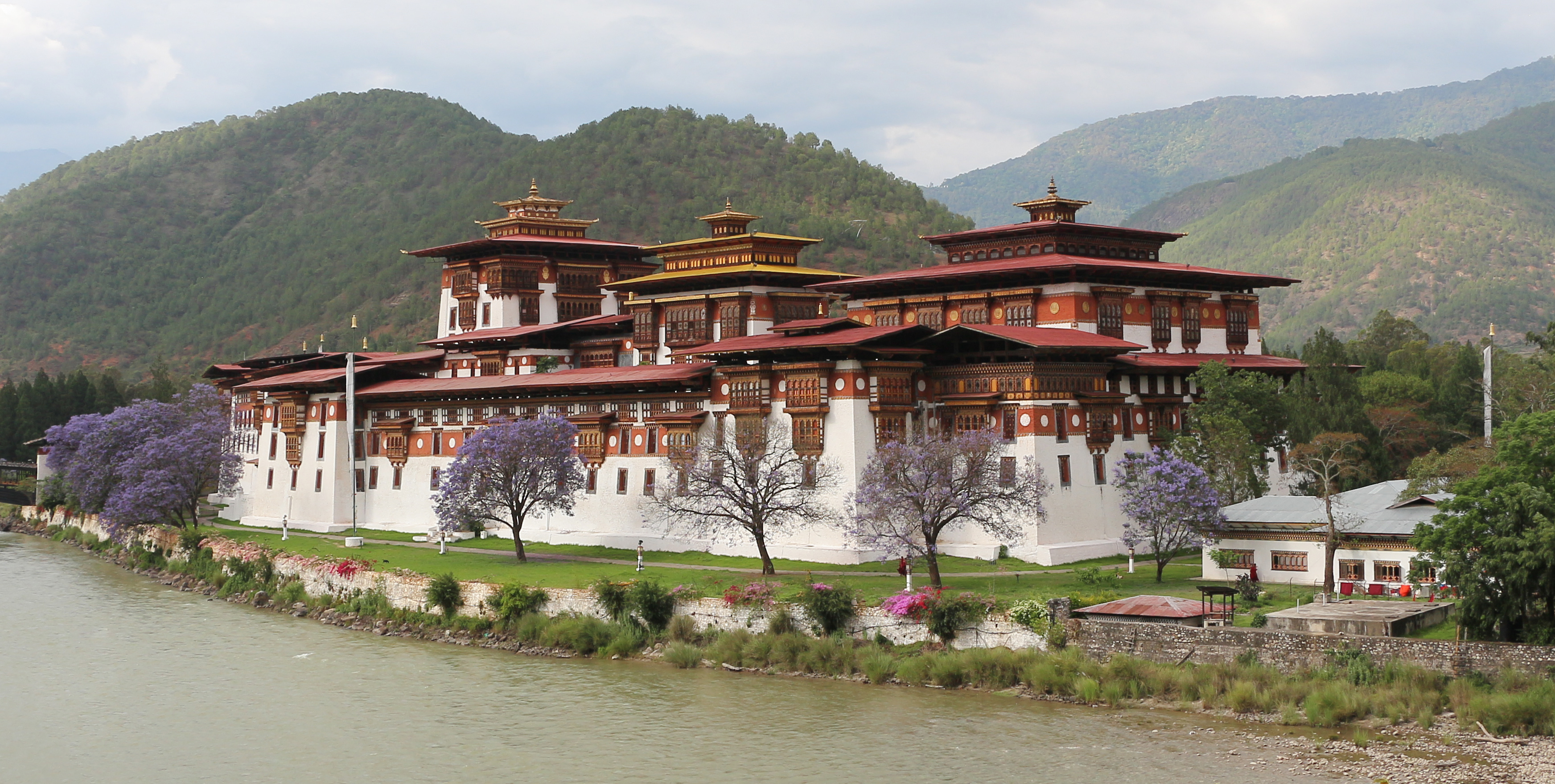
- Pungthang Dechen Phodrang Dzong at Punakha and Jacaranda trees

- Location within Bhutan

Religion
- Affiliation: Tibetan Buddhism
- Sect: Drukpa Kagyu

Location
- Location: Punakha, Bhutan
- Interactive map of Punakha Dzong; Pungthang Dechen Phodrang Dzong
- Coordinates: 27°34′55″N 89°51′47″E

Architecture
- Architects: Zow Balep and Ngawang Namgyal
- Style: Dzong
- Established: 1638; 388 years ago
- Completed: 1638

The Punakha Dzong, also known as Pungthang Dewa Chhenbi Phodrang (meaning "the palace of great happiness or bliss"), is the administrative centre of Punakha District in Punakha, Bhutan. Constructed by Ngawang Namgyal, 1st Zhabdrung Rinpoche, in 1637–38, it is the second oldest and second-largest dzong in Bhutan and one of its most majestic structures. The dzong houses the sacred relics of the southern Drukpa Lineage of the Kagyu school of Tibetan Buddhism, including the Rangjung Kharsapani and the sacred remains of Ngawang Namgyal and the tertön Pema Lingpa.

Punakha Dzong was the administrative center and the seat of the Government of Bhutan until 1955, when the capital was moved to Thimphu. It has been the venue for coronation of all the kings of Bhutan since 1907. It is on Bhutan's Tentative List for UNESCO World Heritage Site inclusion.

== Geography ==
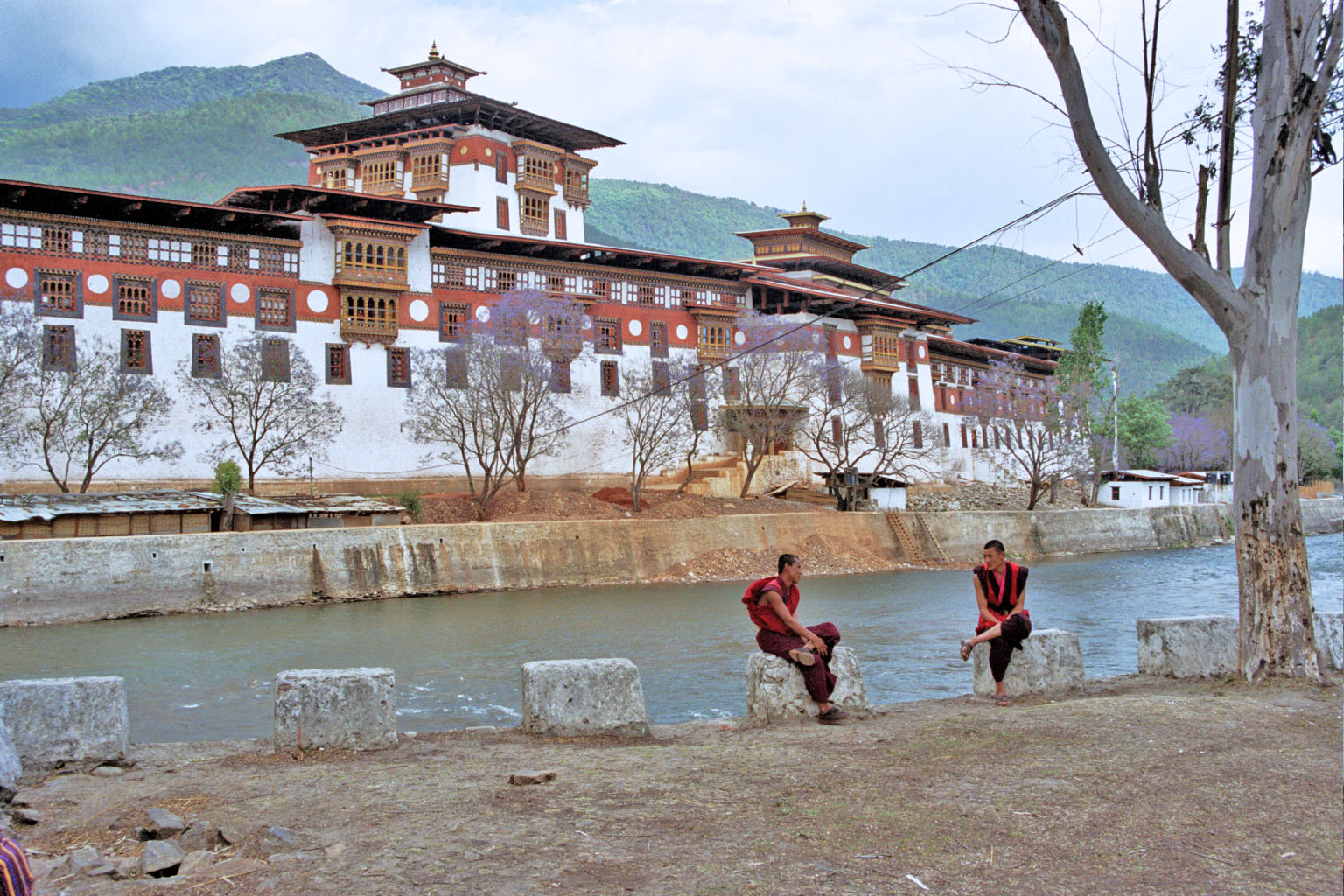
Punakha Dzong and the Mo Chhu

The dzong is located at an elevation of 1200 meters between the Pho Chhu (Male) and Mo Chhu (Female) rivers in the Punakha–valley. The source of the Mo Chu River is in the northern hills of Lighsi and Laya in Bhutan, and in Tibet. The Po Chu River is fed by glaciers in the Lunana region of the Punakha Valley. After the confluence of these two rivers, the main river is known as Puna Tsang Chu or Sankosh River. It flows through Wangdue Phodrang, crosses the Bhutan–India border at Kalikhola and eventually meets the Brahmaputra River.

In view of the healthy climate in the region, Punakha is the winter capital of Bhutan. The head of the clergy of Bhutan with his entourage of monks spend the winter in this dzong. Jacaranda trees grow around the dzong, blooming with mauve flowers in the spring.

== History ==
The construction of the dzong was started in 1637 and completed in 1638. Ngawang Namgyal, the first leader of a unified Bhutan, ordered it built, and its architect was Zowe Palep. A legend has arisen concerning the construction. It holds that Palep had a vision in a dream after the Zhabdrung ordered him to sleep under a small structure which contained a statue of the Buddha, known as Dzong Chug ("small dzong"). In his dream, prompted by the psychic powers of the Zhabdrung, he had a clear vision of a palace for Guru Rinpoche. The vision was imprinted on the architect's mind, enabling him to conceive the plan for the dzong without putting the vision on paper and to build it at the place where the Dzong Chug had stood.

The dzong was consecrated in the name of Pungthang Dechen Phodrang. In 1639, a commemorative chapel was erected to house the arms seized from the Tibetans who were defeated by the Bhutanese on this spot. The Zhabdrung also set up a monastic order with 600 monks (brought from Cheri Gompa in the upper Thimphu Valley), and he lived here till his death.

The spire at the top of the utse (the dzong's central tower or the main tower) was added in 1676 by Gyaltsen Tenzin Rabgye, the abbot of the dzong. Further additions were made during the period 1744 to 1763, when Sherab Wangchuk was the ruler. A large thangka known as chenma (great) thoundral of the Zhabdrung was donated to the dzong by the desi (ruler). This thangka is displayed during the tshechu held once a year here. The 7th Dalai Lama donated the brass roof for the dzong.

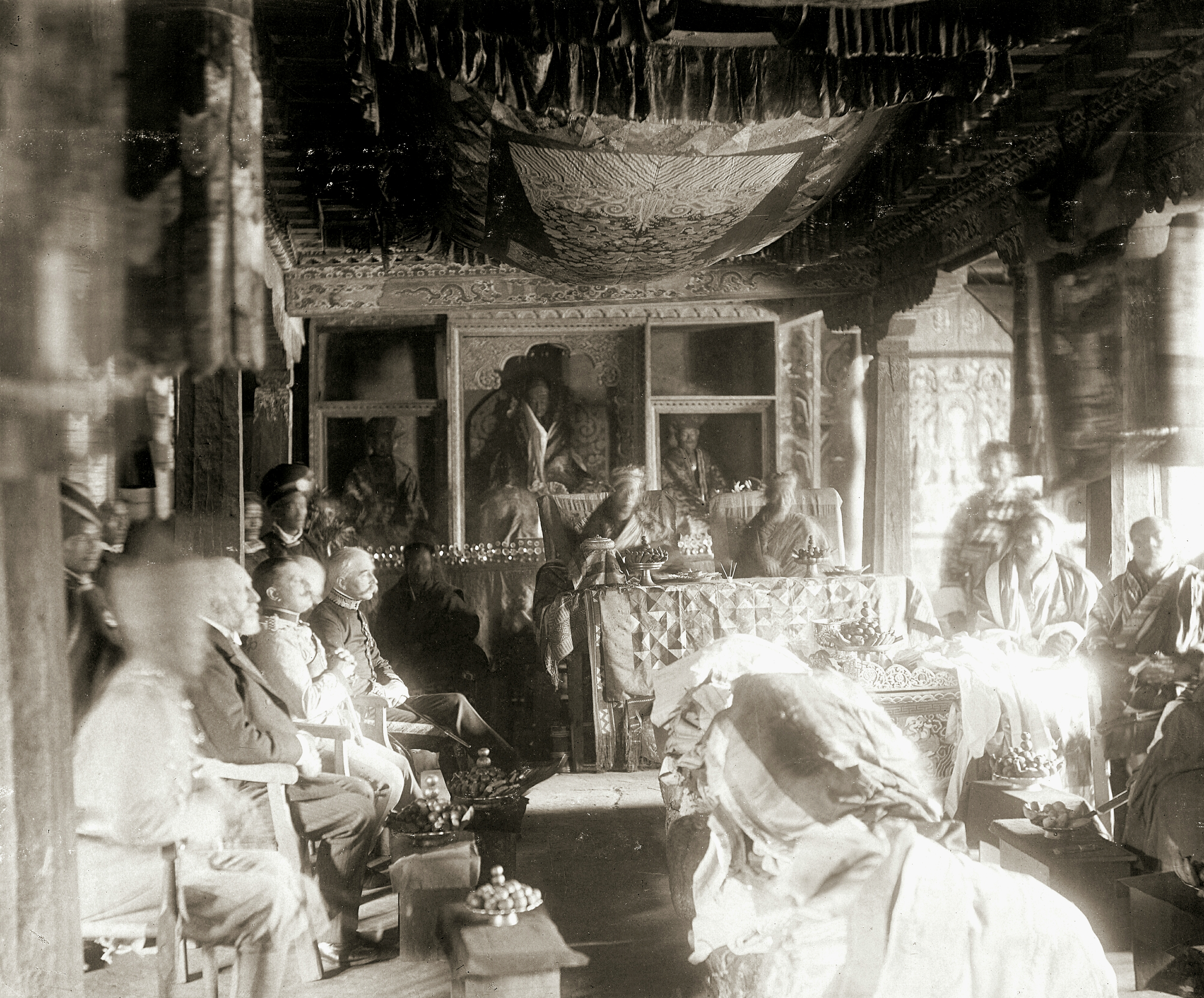
King Ugyen Wangchuck, receiving the order of the Knight Commander of the Order of the British Empire at Punakha Dzong

From 1744 to 1763, the dzong was enlarged substantially during the rule of the 13th desi, when Sherab Wangchuk was the chief abbot of Bhutan. Several fires between 1750 and 1849 caused damages to the Dzong. In the 1897 earthquake, the dzong was severely damaged and also suffered numerous fires.

Punakha Dzong was the site of the coronation in 1907 of Ugyen Wangchuck as the first Druk Gyalpo, head of the current ruling dynasty. At that time, Punakha was the capital of Bhutan. Three years later, a treaty was signed at Punakha whereby the British agreed not to interfere in Bhutanese internal affairs and Bhutan allowed Britain to direct its foreign affairs.

Flash floods resulting from glacial lake outburst flooding in the upper reaches of the valley are a common occurrence on the Mo Chu and Pho Chu rivers, and have caused flooding and damage to the dzong, especially in 1957, 1960 and 1994. Fires and earthquakes have further added to the problem. In 1986, the dzong was partially destroyed by fire. In 1996, flash floods in the Pho Chu river damaged the large stupa and caused several deaths.

After a major refurbishing carried out in the "zorig chusum tradition" (an ancient tradition of crafts in wood carving, masonry, metal work, painting, and several other skills), the dzong now has several new Lhakhangs, over 200 new religious images, and several other treasures. A consecration known as the Rabney Ceremony, performed by the Je Khenpo and the monks of the Dratshang (central monk body), was held from May 13 to 15, 2004, corresponding to the 12th to 14th day of the third Bhutanese month. The restoration work was largely funded by the Government of India, and the dzong stands fully restored.

In 2008, after completion of a new cantilever bridge, the new bridge was hailed in a celebration entitled "100 years of Wangchuck Monarchy in 2008 and to the coronation of His Majesty King Jigme Khesar Namgyel Wangchuck in the Punakha Dzong". A memorial honouring the 23 people who died in the dzong in the glacial floods in 1994 has also been erected just outside the dzong.

=== Royal wedding ===
The wedding of the Druk Gyalpo Jigme Khesar Namgyel Wangchuck to Jetsun Pema was held at the Punakha Dzong on 13 October 2011.

== Architecture ==
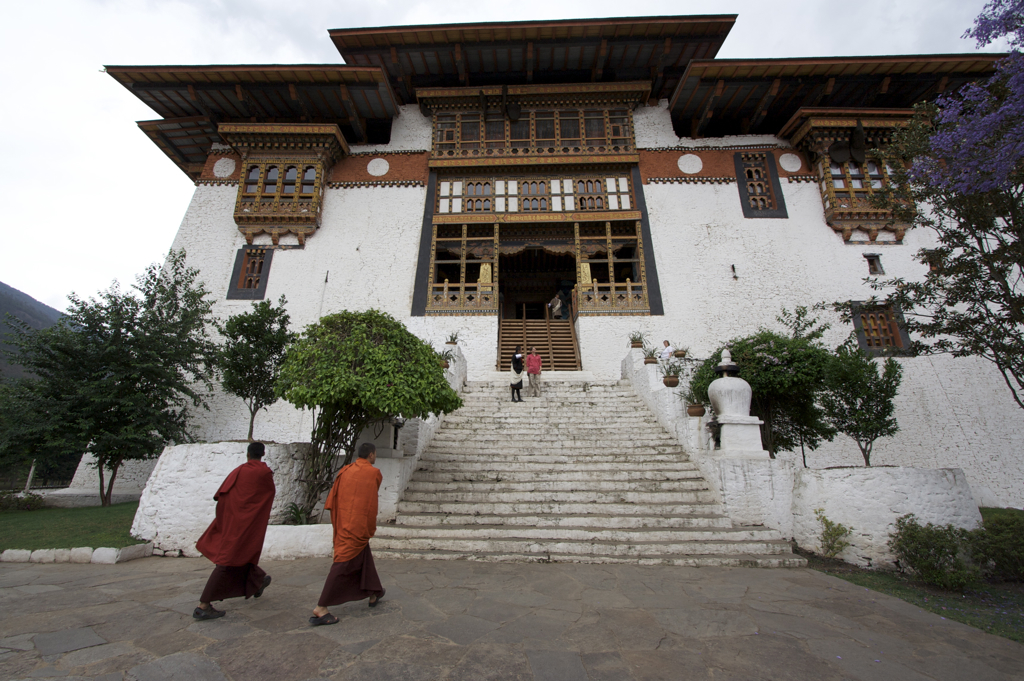
Main entrance

The dzong is part of the Drukpa Lineage of the Kagyu school of Tibetan Buddhism in Bhutan. It is the second oldest and most majestic dzong in Bhutan built at the orders of Ngawang Namgyal. It is a six-storied structure with a central tower or utse at an average elevation of 1,200 m (3,900 ft) with a scenic, mountainous background. The materials used in building the dzong consisted of compacted earth, stones and timber in doors and windows.

The dzong was constructed as an "embodiment of Buddhist values" and was one of the 16 dzongs built by the Zhabdrung during his rule from 1594 to 1651. The dzong measures 180 m (590 ft) in length with a width of 72 m (236 ft) and has three docheys (courtyards). The defensive fortifications built in the dzong to protect it from enemy attacks consist of a steep wooden draw stairway and a heavy wooden door that is closed at night. After the dzong suffered damage due to a fire, a large prayer hall was added in 1986.

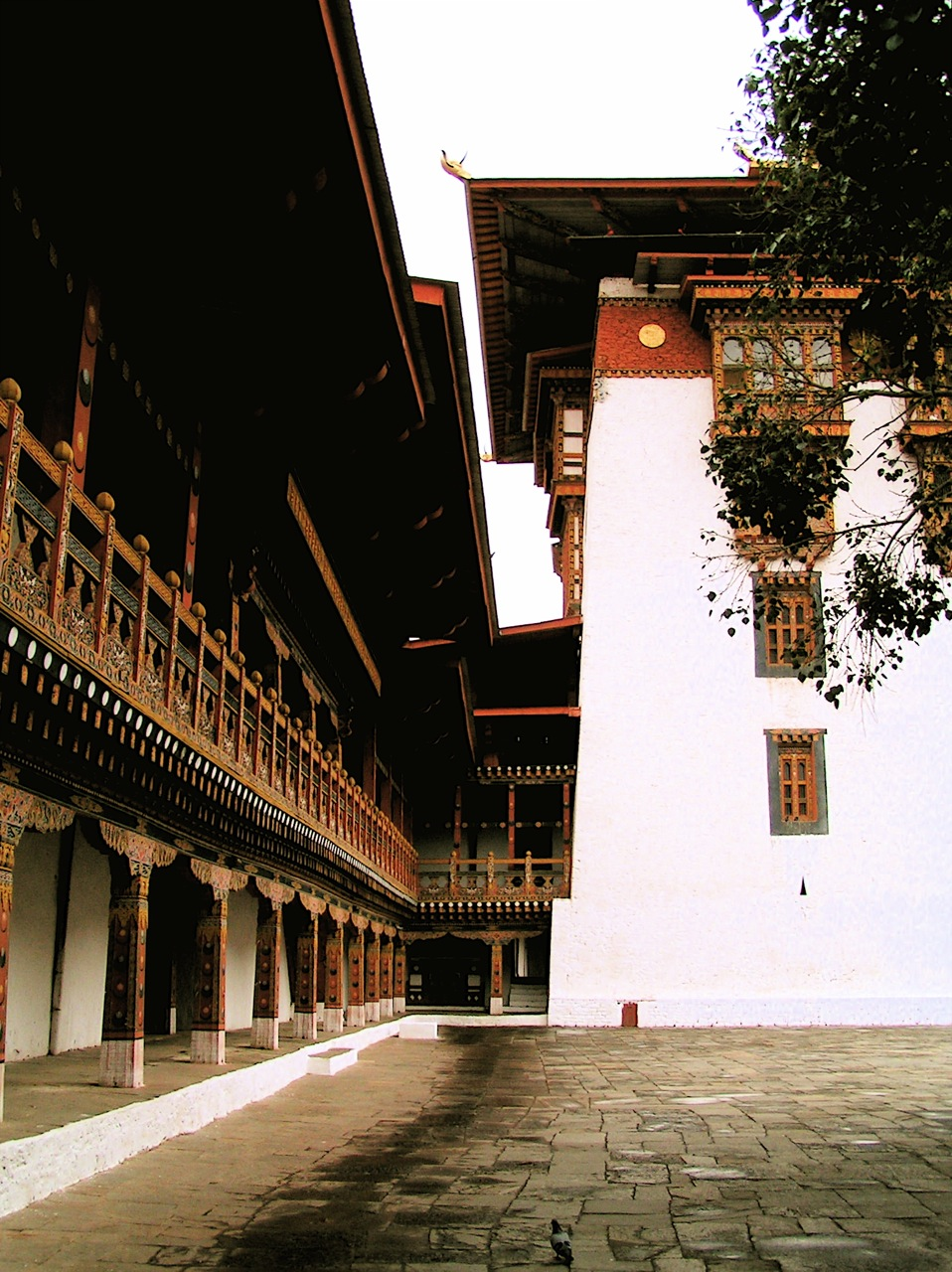
Interior buildings

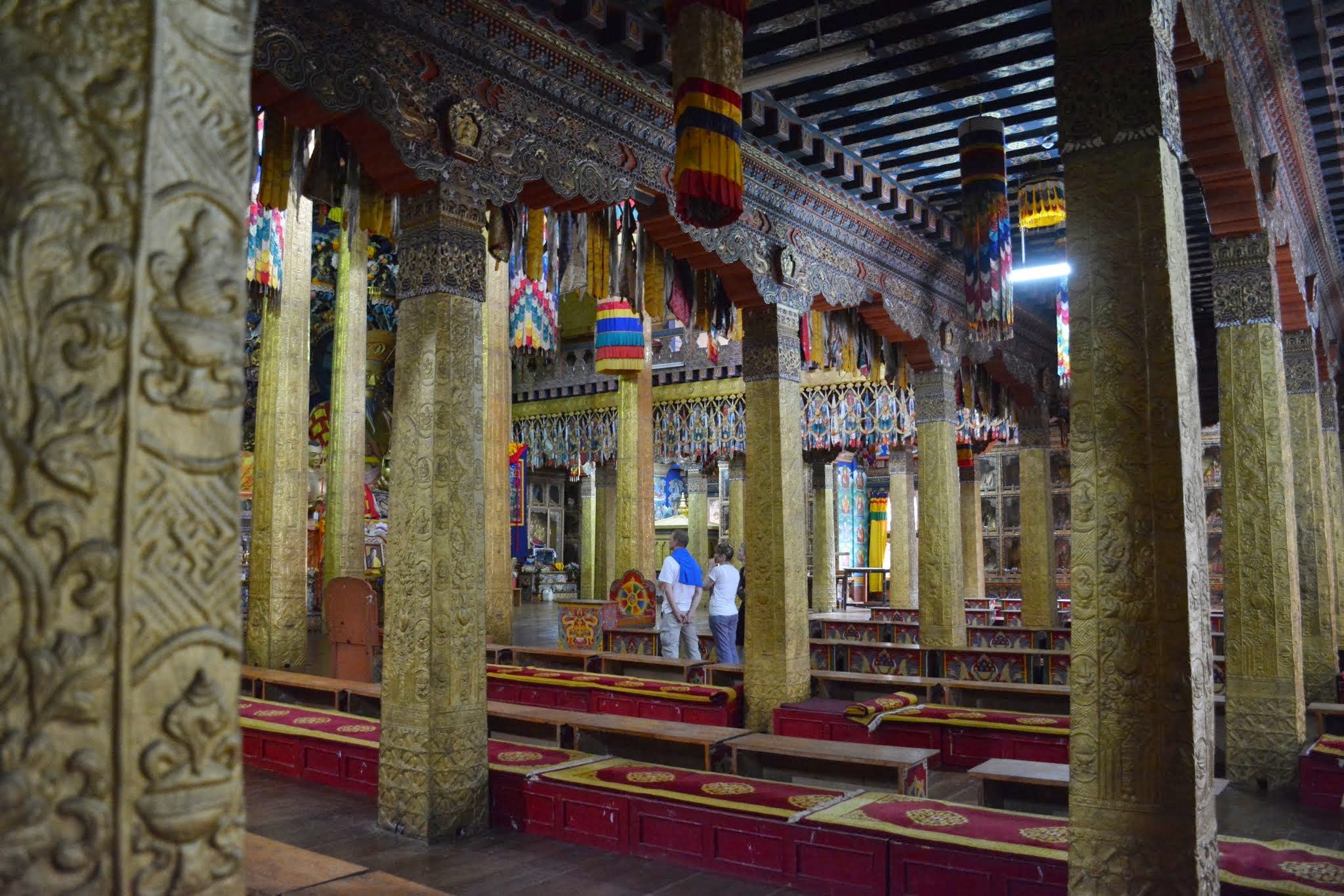
Punakha Dzong (interior view)

Administrative offices of the dzong, a very large, white-washed stupa and a bodhi tree are located in the first courtyard. Also seen in the same courtyard, on the far left, are a mound of stones and a chapel dedicated to the queen of the nāgas. The residential quarters of monks are located in the second courtyard, with the utse intervening in between the first and the second courtyards. There are two historic halls in this courtyard: one of Ugyen Wangchuck, who subsequently became the king, and another where the king was decorated in 1905 with the Order of the Knight Commander of the Indian Empire by John Claude White. The third courtyard is at the southernmost end of the dzong, where the remains of Pema Lingpa and Ngawang Namgyal are preserved. Machey Lakhang ('machey' means "sacred embalmed body") in the third courtyard has the embalmed body of Zhabdrung. This Lakhang was rebuilt in 1995. The casket containing the embalmed body is not opened. However, the place is visited by the king and the Je Khenpo, mainly to seek blessings before assuming their offices.

After the restoration of the dzong around the turn of the twenty-first century, notable images, statues and thangkas are displayed in the dzong. These include murals depicting life story of Buddha done during the rule of the second druk desi. Large gilded statues of Buddha, Guru Rinpoche and Zhabdrung, which date to the mid-18th century, and gilded panels on pillars are also here.

A covered wooden cantilever bridge crossing the Mo Chu river was built together with the dzong in the 17th century. This bridge was washed away by a flash flood in 1957. In 2006, work started on a new wooden cantilever bridge in the traditional style, with a free span of 55 m (180 ft). It was completed in 2008.

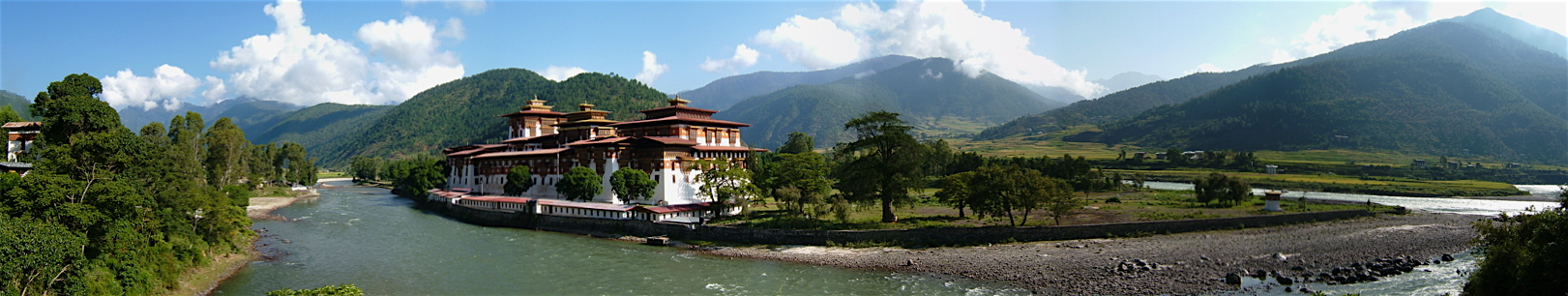
A panoramic view of the Punakha Dzong, the old capital of Bhutan, at the confluence of Pho Chu and Mo Chu rivers

== Festivals ==
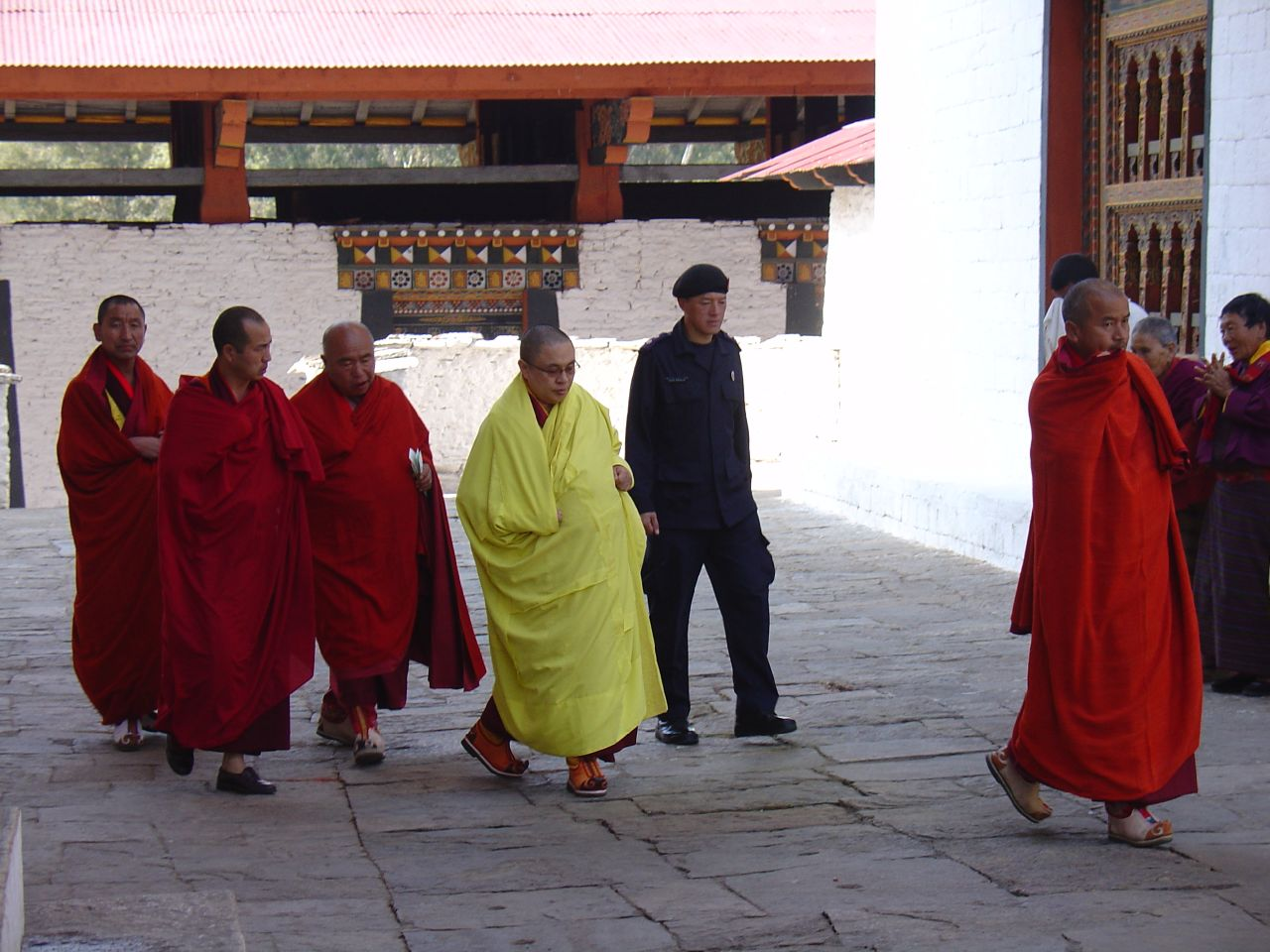
The Spiritual Leader of Bhutan Je Khenpo Walking to the Punakha festival

Punakha Dromche and Punakha Tshechu are the annual festival held at the dzong, and they are attended by people from the villages and far places of the district. The rangjung "self-created" image of Avalokiteśvara enshrined in the utse of the dzong (brought by the Zhabdrung from Tibet) is displayed during the festival. During this five-day festival, also known as Punakha Festival, held starting on the 9th day of the 1st month of the Bhutanese calendar, which falls in February–March, there are some notable displays. The most important is a re-enactment of the Tibetan invasion of Bhutan in 1639, wherein the Tibetans were defeated. This theatrical display, which was conceived by the Zhabdrung, dramatizes a mock throwing of a relic into the Mo Chu River.

The final day of the festival marks the display of an image of Zhabdrung followed by a group dance performance by 136 pazaps, dressed as warriors, in the main courtyard. At the end of the performance, the dancers descend the front entrance of the dzong in revelry – whistling and shouting. The monks led by the Je Khenpo of the dzong then parade to the Mo Chu River bank with much fanfare. Je Khenpo flings oranges into the river, marking the Rangjung Kharsapani, which is an offering to the nāgas residing below the river bed. After this act, traditional mask dances commemorating the construction of the dzong are performed on its premises.

Another ritual observed every year at this dzong is called the Lhenkey Dungchhur, which is a worship for departed souls.
