= Sankosh River =

River in Bhutan and India

Sankosh River Puna Thsang Chu
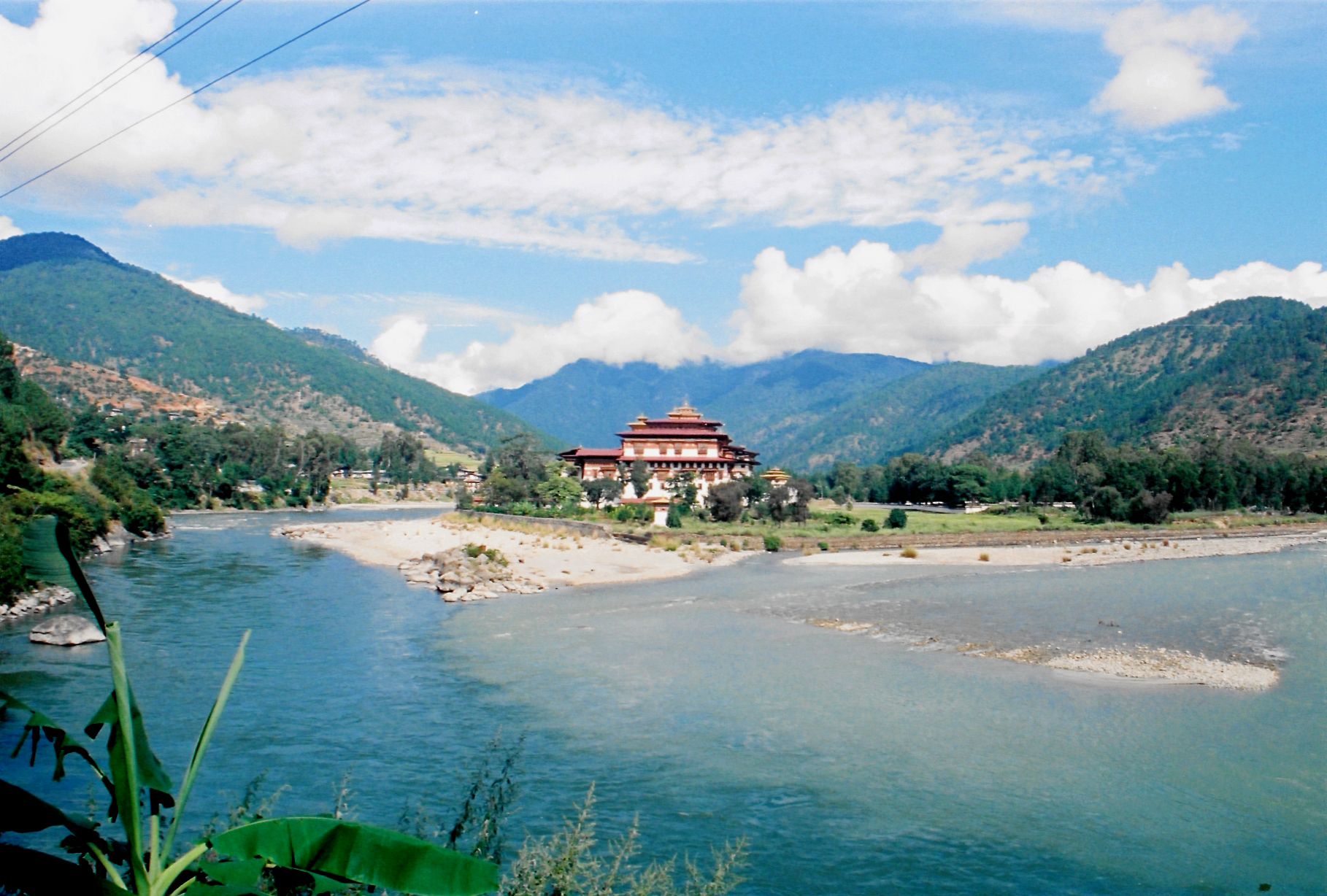
- Sankosh River near Sopsokha, Bhutan

- Mouth of Sankosh River in Assam Sankosh River (India)

Physical characteristics
- Source: North Bhutan
  - coordinates: 28°3′51.63″N 89°42′46.74″E
- Mouth: Brahmaputra River
  - coordinates: 25°58′13.84″N 89°50′20.33″E

The Sankosh (also Puna Thsang Chu) is a river that rises in northern Bhutan and empties into the Brahmaputra in the state of Assam in India. In Bhutan, it is known as the Puna Tsang Chu below the confluences of several tributaries near the town of Wangdue Phodrang.

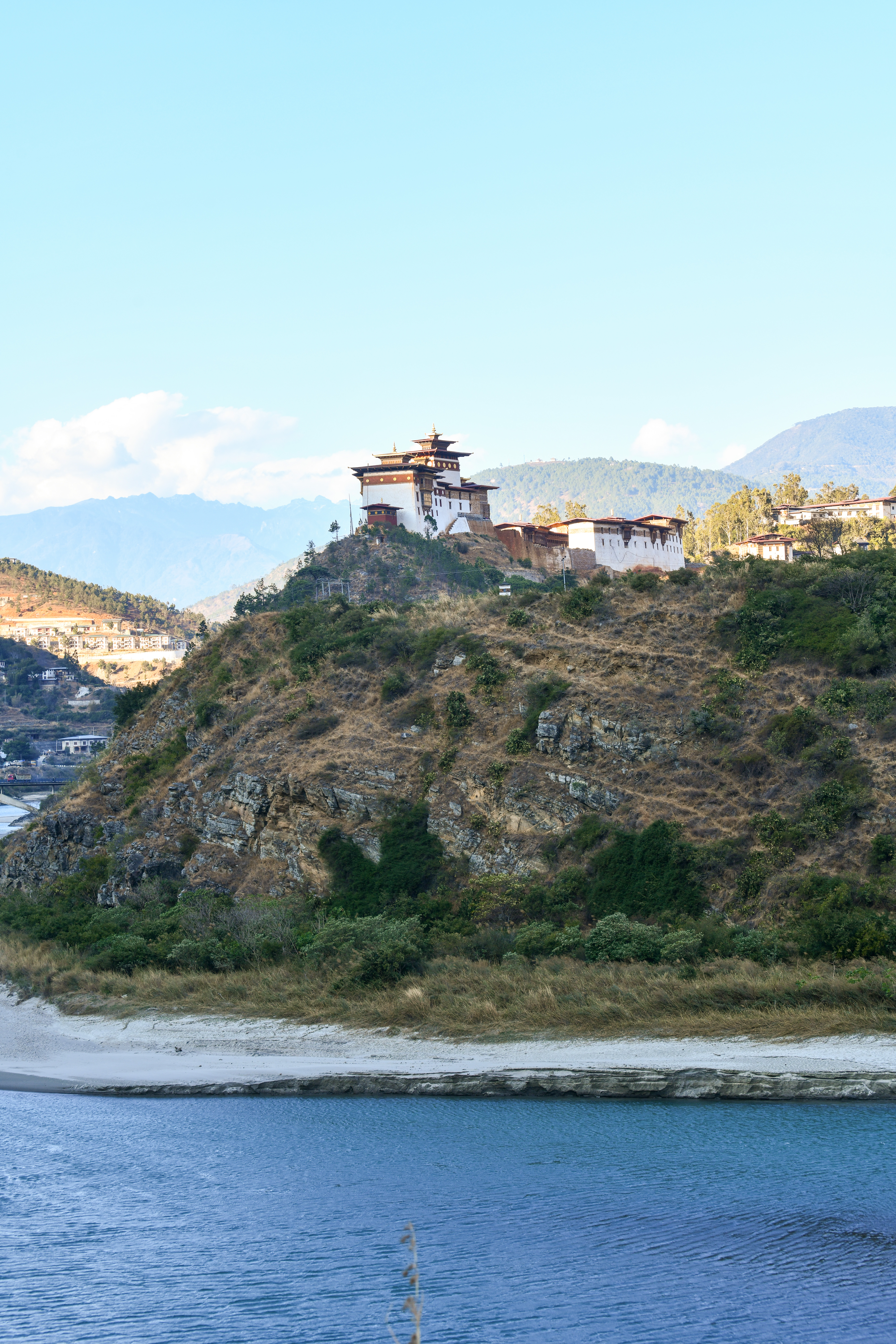
Wangdue Photrang Dzong overlooking the Sankosh River

The two largest tributaries are the Mo Chhu and Pho Chhu, which flow together at Punakha. The Punakha dzong, which is situated immediately above the confluence of the two rivers, is one of the most beautiful dzongs in Bhutan and the winter residence of the Dratshang Lhentshog. The upper reaches of the Pho Chhu are susceptible to ice blockages, and the dzong has been damaged on several occasions by glacial lake outburst floods. After it enters India, it flows on the border of Assam and West Bengal. At Wangdue Phodrang, elevation 1,364 metres (4,475 ft), the river is joined by the west flowing Tang Chuu and it enters a precipitous gorge. The highway running south from Wangdue Phodrang to Dagana follows the river for much of its course. Near the town of Takshay is the confluence with the west flowing Hara Chhu. The last major Bhutanese tributary is the Daga Chhu.
