= Lingmukha Gewog =

Lingmukha Gewog གླིང་མུ་ཁ་
- Gewog
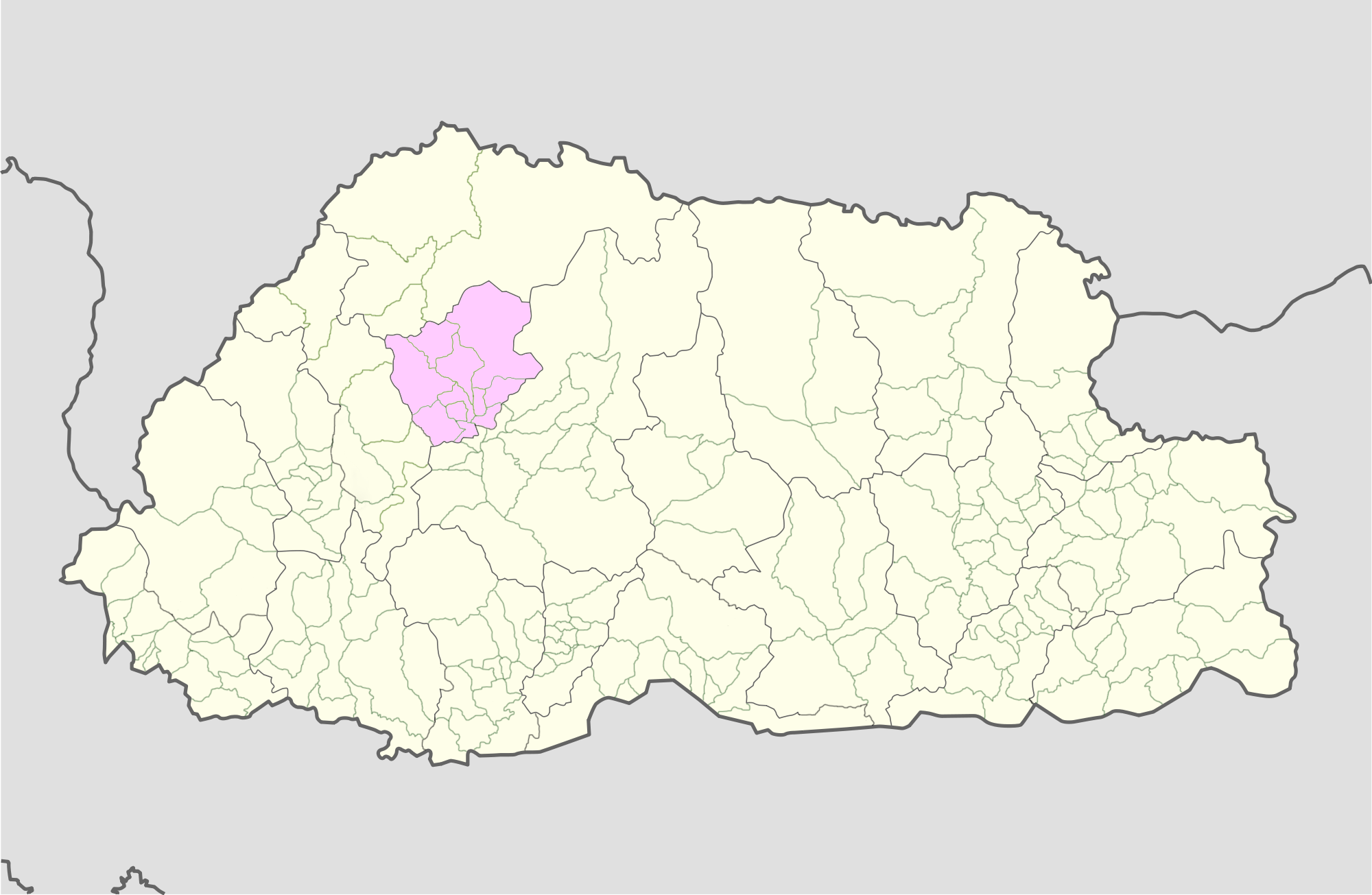
- Coordinates: 27°33′N 89°54′E
- Country: Bhutan
- District: Punakha District

Area
  - Total: 33.8 km^{2} (13.1 sq mi)

Population (2017)
  - Total: 1,018
- Time zone: UTC+6 (BTT)

Lingmukha Gewog (Dzongkha: གླིང་མུ་ཁ་རྒེད་འོག) is a gewog in Punakha District (dzongkhag), Bhutan. Spread over an area of 33.8 km^{2} (13.1 sq mi), it had a population of 1,018 in 2017.

== Geography ==
Lingmukha Gewog is one of the eleven gewogs in Punakha District (dzongkhag), Bhutan. It is spread over an area of 33.8 km^{2} (13.1 sq mi). It is located in the southeastern part of the district and is bordered by Shenga Bjime Gewog, Barp Gewog, Talo Gewog, Dzomi Gewog, and Wangdue Phodrang District.

The gewog is located at an altitude ranging from 1,200 to 3,000 m (3,900 to 9,800 ft). It experiences a subtropical climate with warm and humid summers and cool winters. The average temperature ranges from 5 to 30 °C (41 to 86 °F) and the annual precipitation ranges from 500 to 1,500 mm (20 to 59 in). Approximately 75% of the land area is covered by forests.

The gewog is divided into five chiwogs–Dompala, Lingmukha, Nabchhed, Goomkarmo and Oomtekha.

== Demographics and economy ==
According to the 2017 Population and Housing Census of Bhutan, Lingmukha Gewog had a population of 1,018, comprising 535 males and 483 females. The gewog had 260 households, with an average household size of 3.7 people. Approximately 99% of households have access to safe drinking water.

Agriculture and animal husbandry are practised in the gewog. Major crops grown in the Gewog include rice, wheat, mustard, and maize. Approximately 269 acres (109 ha) of land was under rice cultivation and the gewog produced an estimated quantity of 427.71 t (471.47 tons) of rice in 2014.

The gewog has one Renewable Natural Resources centre, one Basic Health Unit, one primary school, one non-formal education centre, one multipurpose hall and community center, and five temples.
