= Punakha =

Punakha སྤུ་ན་ཁ་
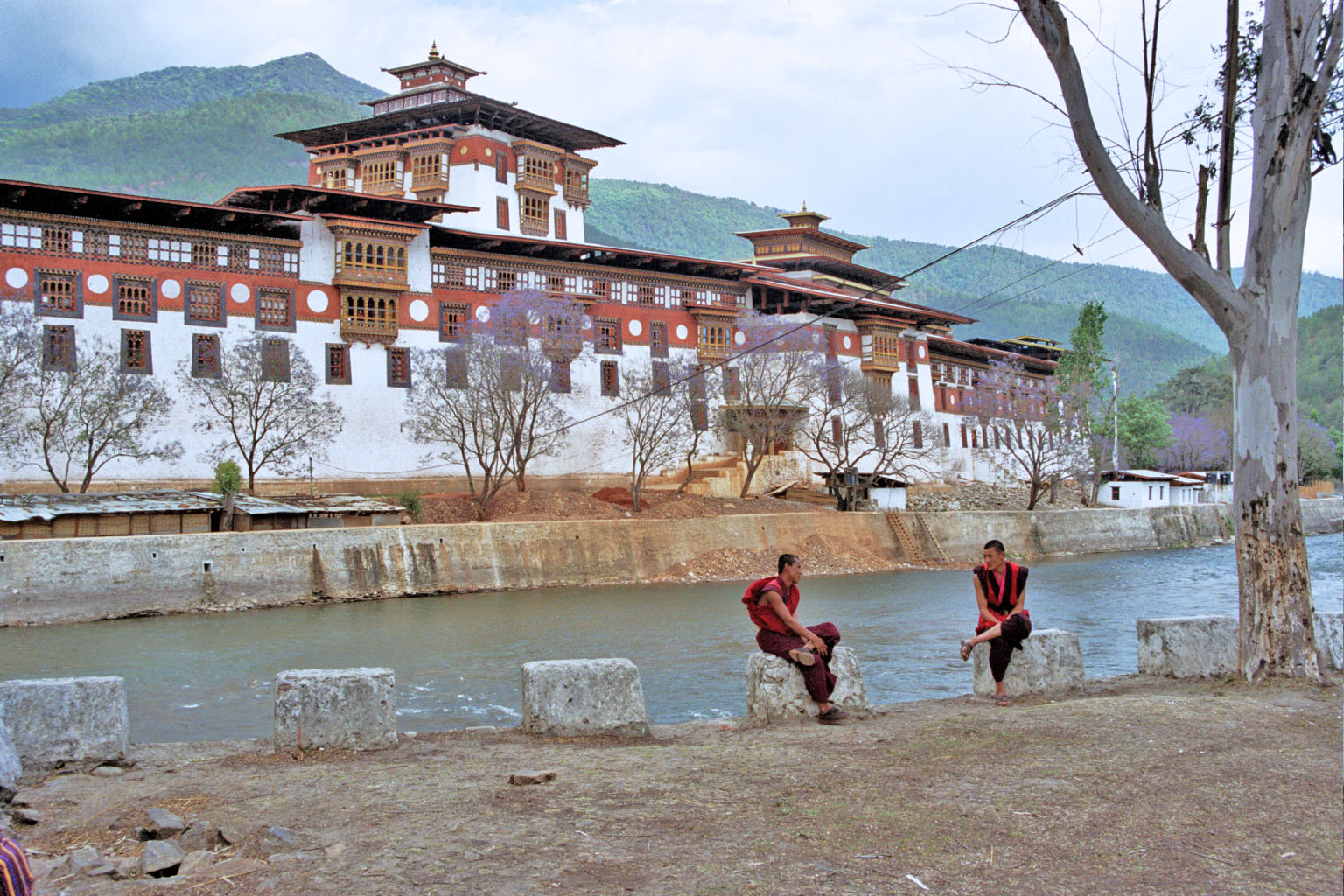
- Punakha Dzong and the Mo Chhu

- Location within Bhutan
- Coordinates: 27°35′N 89°51.5′E
- Country: Bhutan
- District: Punakha

Population (2017)
  - Total: 6,262
- Time zone: UTC+06:00 (BTT)

Punakha (Dzongkha: སྤུ་ན་ཁ་) is the administrative centre of Punakha dzongkhag, one of the 20 districts of Bhutan. Punakha was the capital of Bhutan and the seat of government until 1955, when the capital was moved to Thimphu. It is about 72 km away from Thimphu, and it takes about 3 hours by car from the capital. Unlike Thimphu, it is quite warm in winter and hot in summer. It is located at an elevation of 1,200 metres above sea level, and rice is grown as the main crop along the river valleys of two main rivers of Bhutan, the Pho Chhu and Mo Chhu. Dzongkha is widely spoken in this district.

== Pungthang Dewachen Gi Phodrang ==
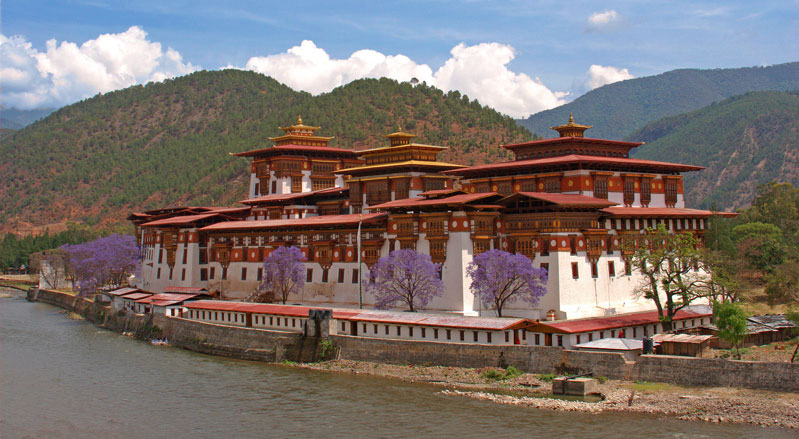
Pungthang Dewachen Gi Phodrang in Punakha and jacarandas

Pungthang Dewachen Phodrang (Palace of Great Happiness) or Punakha Dzong was constructed by Tuebi Zaow Balip under the great command of Zhabdrung Ngawang Namgyal in 1637 and believed to have been completed in a two-year time period. It is also the country's most beautiful Dzong. It is the winter residence of Bhutan's Central Monastic Body led by the Je Khenpo. The Dzong houses the most sacred relics of the Southern Drukpa Kagyu school including the Rangjung Kasarpani, and the sacred remains of Zhabdrung Ngawang Namgyal and Tertön Padma Lingpa.

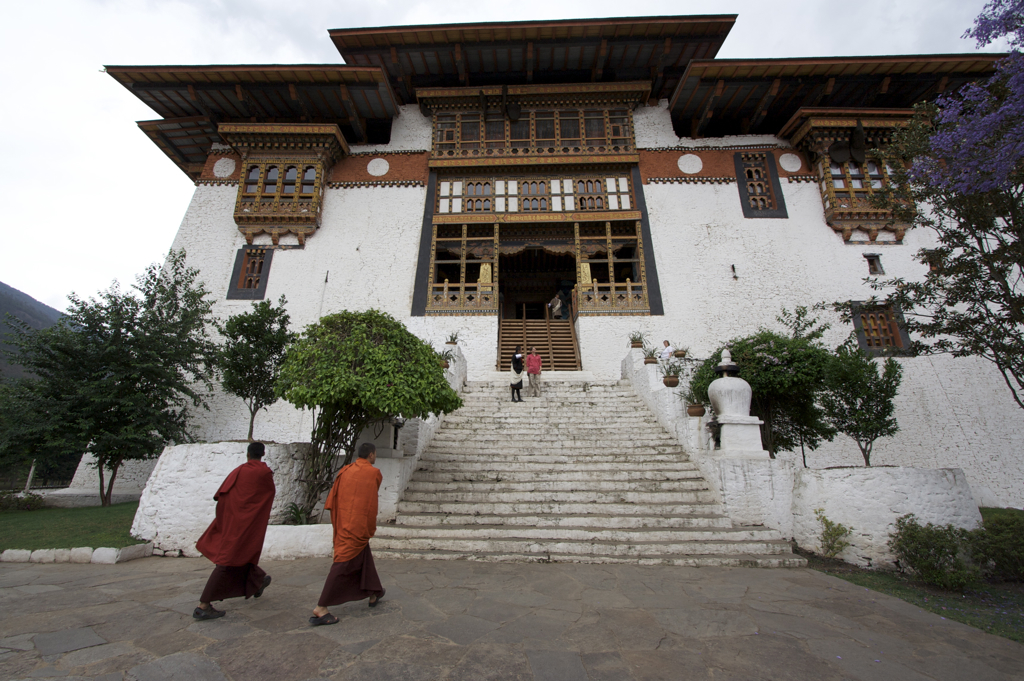
Punakha Dzong

In 1907, Punakha Dzong was the site of the coronation of Ugyen Wangchuck as the first King of Bhutan. Three years later, a treaty was signed at Punakha whereby the British agreed not to interfere in Bhutanese internal affairs and Bhutan allowed Britain to direct its foreign affairs.

In 1780, 1789, 1802, 1831, 1849, and in 1986, the dzong was partially destroyed by fire. It also experienced an Earthquake in 1897 and a flood in 1994.

Due to its location at the confluence of the Pho Chhu and Mo Chhu rivers in the Punakha-Wangdue valley, the dzong is vulnerable to flash flooding caused by glacier lakes (GLOF). According to a recent report, flash flood damage to Punakha Dzong occurred in 1957, 1960 and 1994. In March 2010, works were started in order to protect the dzong from flood damage by deepening the river channels and raising the embankments.

A covered wooden cantilever bridge crossing the Mo Chhu river was built together with the Dzong in the 17th century. This bridge was washed away by a flash flood in 1957 or 1958. In 2006 work started on a new covered wooden cantilever bridge of traditional construction with a free span of 55 meters which was completed in 2008 with the help from Germany.

== Ritsha ==
Punakha valley is famous in Bhutan for rice farming. Both red and white rice are grown along the river valley of Pho and Mo Chu, two of the most prominent rivers in Bhutan. Ritsha (meaning at the base of a hill) is a typical village in Punakha. The village houses are made of pounded mud with stone foundations. Each house is only two stories high. Surrounding the houses are the gardens and the rice fields. The gardens also usually have fruit-bearing plants like oranges and papayas. The village is 1 km away from Punakha-Gasa highway and currently, the villagers are engaged in constructing the 1 km farm road. In recent years, the farming work is mechanized and power-tillers instead of bullocks are used to plough the fields and villagers have become relatively prosperous. This village is often called the ‘rice bowl’ of Bhutan due to abundance of red and white rice.

== Festivities ==
Punakha Domchoe, which takes place in the first month of the Bhutanese year, is an important event in Bhutanese culture, combining powerful rites with a dazzling display of horsemanship and sword play.

== Climate ==
Climate data for Punakha elevation 1,236 m (4,055 ft), (1990–2017 normals)
Month	Jan	Feb	Mar	Apr	May	Jun	Jul	Aug	Sep	Oct	Nov	Dec	Year
Record high °C (°F)	27.0 (80.6)	30.5 (86.9)	34.0 (93.2)	35.5 (95.9)	36.0 (96.8)	37.0 (98.6)	36.0 (96.8)	35.5 (95.9)	35.0 (95.0)	35.0 (95.0)	32.5 (90.5)	28.0 (82.4)	37.0 (98.6)
Mean daily maximum °C (°F)	18.8 (65.8)	20.7 (69.3)	23.9 (75.0)	26.8 (80.2)	28.8 (83.8)	30.5 (86.9)	30.7 (87.3)	30.4 (86.7)	29.3 (84.7)	27.4 (81.3)	23.9 (75.0)	20.2 (68.4)	26.0 (78.7)
Daily mean °C (°F)	12.3 (54.1)	14.3 (57.7)	17.6 (63.7)	20.6 (69.1)	23.1 (73.6)	25.2 (77.4)	25.8 (78.4)	25.5 (77.9)	24.4 (75.9)	22.0 (71.6)	17.7 (63.9)	13.8 (56.8)	20.2 (68.3)
Mean daily minimum °C (°F)	5.8 (42.4)	7.9 (46.2)	11.2 (52.2)	14.4 (57.9)	17.3 (63.1)	19.9 (67.8)	20.8 (69.4)	20.6 (69.1)	19.4 (66.9)	16.6 (61.9)	11.4 (52.5)	7.3 (45.1)	14.4 (57.9)
Record low °C (°F)	0.0 (32.0)	0.0 (32.0)	2.0 (35.6)	8.0 (46.4)	10.0 (50.0)	12.0 (53.6)	15.0 (59.0)	13.5 (56.3)	12.0 (53.6)	7.0 (44.6)	1.0 (33.8)	1.0 (33.8)	0.0 (32.0)
Average rainfall mm (inches)	13.7 (0.54)	21.7 (0.85)	17.1 (0.67)	43.5 (1.71)	85.4 (3.36)	143.2 (5.64)	157.9 (6.22)	147.9 (5.82)	101.0 (3.98)	46.2 (1.82)	4.7 (0.19)	3.6 (0.14)	785.9 (30.94)
Average relative humidity (%)	75.1	75.9	74.2	73.6	76.4	79.5	81.2	80.9	81.8	78.4	77.0	76.5	77.5
Source: National Center for Hydrology and Meteorology

== See also ==
- Dzong architecture
- Driglam Namzha
- Ngawang Namgyal
