= Lhakhang =

Tibetan buddhist temple

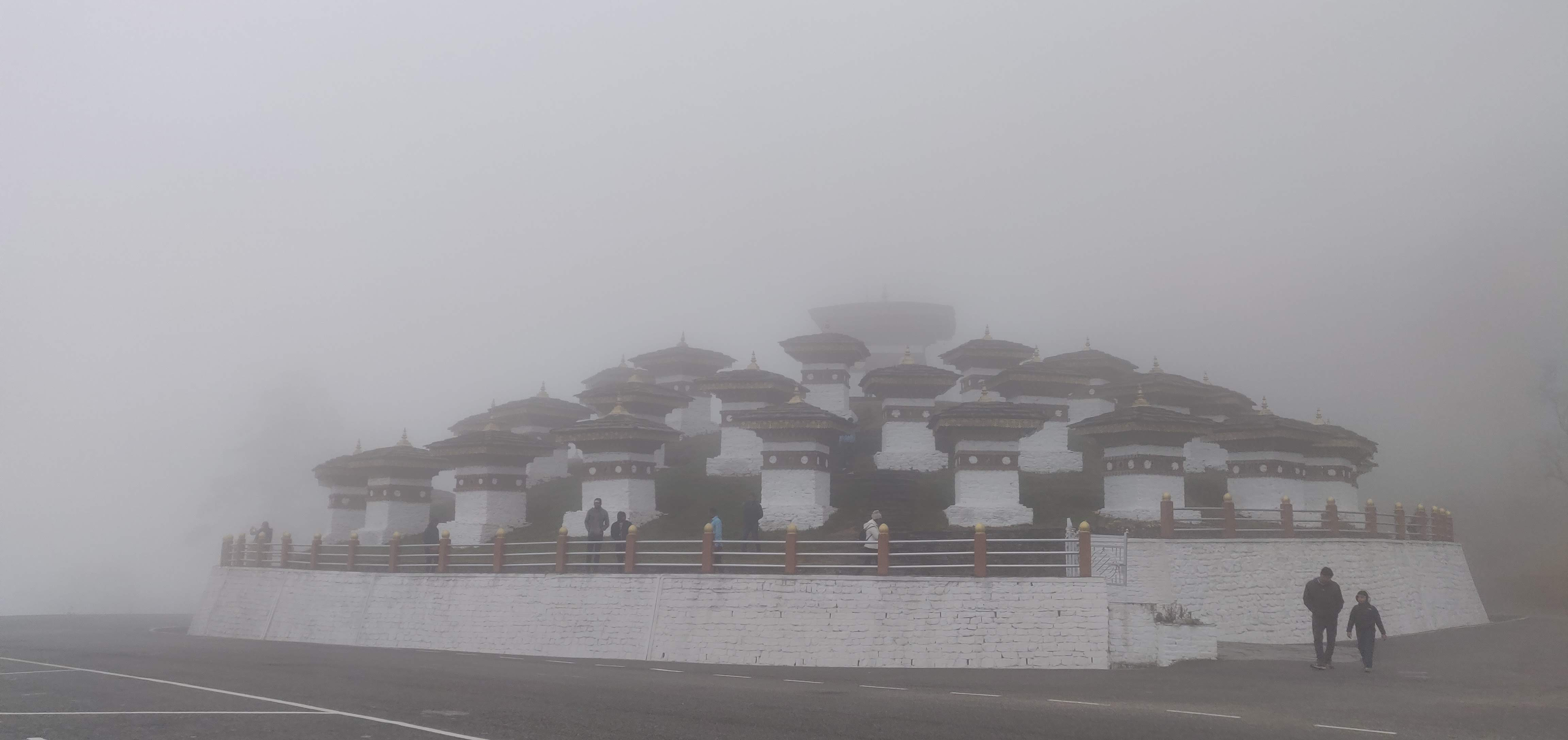
Lhakhang

Lhakhang are religious structures (temples) found throughout the Himalayas (Nepal, Bhutan) that house sacred objects, and in which religious activities take place. Lhakhang means "the house of gods": enlightened beings such as the Buddha, his followers, and other deities.

With over two thousand lhakhangs (temples) and goenpa (monasteries) in Bhutan, they can be found in almost every village and on almost every mountain top in the country. Although they do not match the soaring proportions of the dzongs, many lhakhang and goenpa are older than dzongs, with some dating as far back as the seventh century.

Usually, within a village, the lhakhang is the most prominent building. Besides being religious centres, they also have important social and cultural functions as almost all village cultural events are held there. The Buddhist lhakhang is usually a simple hall with an entrance foyer and a main hall holding the main altar of the temple. Besides the main temple building, simple buildings with rooms for the monks are constructed.

Often the layout of a goenpa monastery consists of one or multiple storey temple building in the centre of a simple courtyard flanked by structures used for the living quarters of the monks.
