= Pho Chhu =

River in Bhutan

Coordinates: 27°34′42″N 89°51′58″E

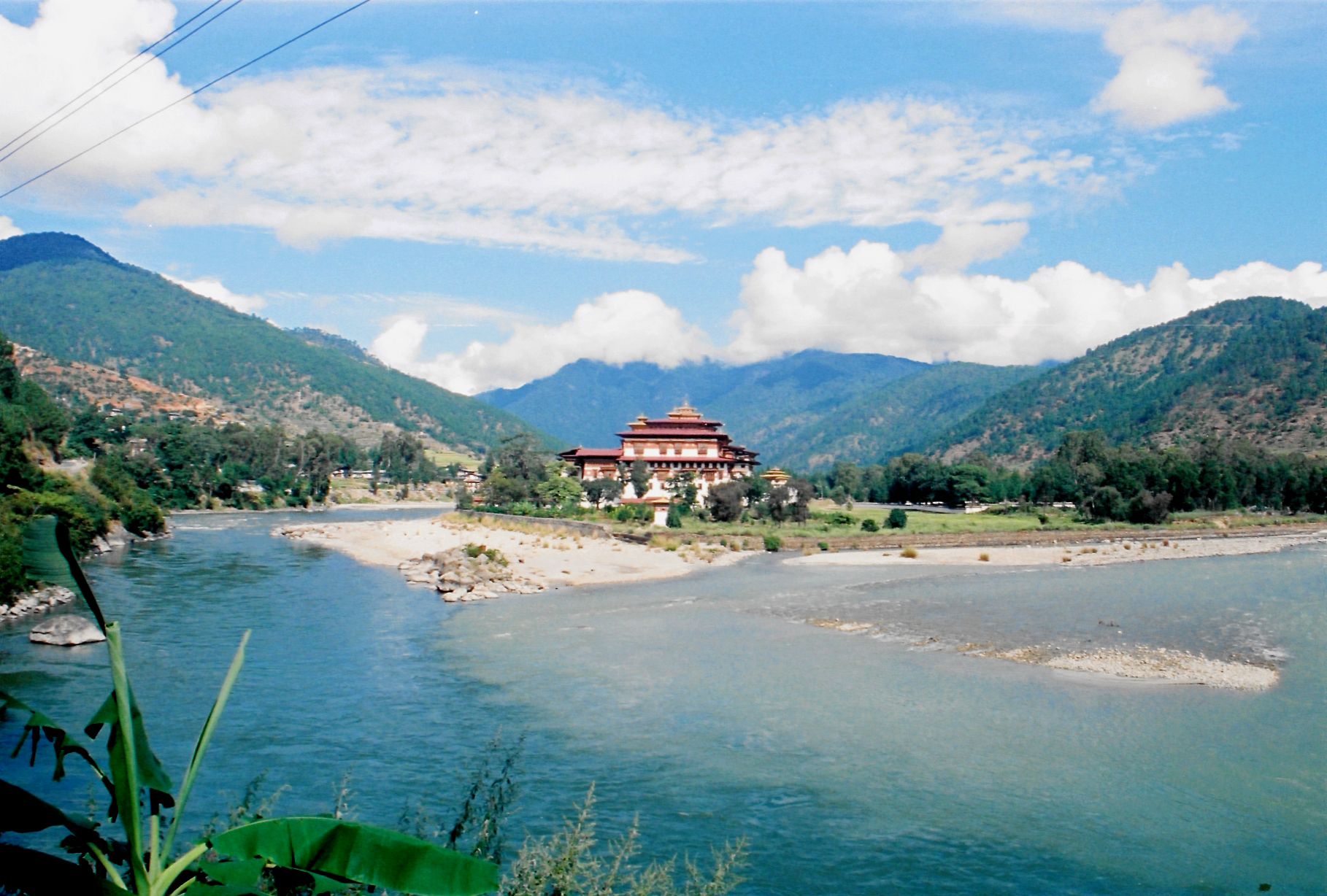
- Confluence of the Pho Chhu (right) and the Mo Chhu (left) below Punakha Dzong (center)

Location
- Country: Bhutan

Physical characteristics
- Source
  - location: Himalayas
- Mouth
  - location: Puna Tsang Chhu

Pho Chhu is a major river in Bhutan. The rivers arises in the slopes of Kula Kangri in the Himalayas. It flows towards the Punakha valley, where its joins the Mo Chhu at near Punakha Dzong to form the Puna Tsang Chhu river, which forms part of the Brahmaputra river system.

== Geography ==
The headwaters of the Pho Chhu are located in the hills of Lunana Gewog in northern Bhutan. The river is fed by glaciers in the Himalayas. The rivers arises in the western slope of Kula Kangri in the Himalayas. The rivers has two branches, with the eastern branch fed by various glaciers near Lunana and the western branch fed by glaciers near Tarina in the gewog.

The Pho Chu basin consists of 154 glaciers covering 334.36 km^{2} (129.10 sq mi) with an estimated ice reserve of 32.27 km^{3} (7.74 cu mi). Of these, 71 glaciers feed the western branch while the remaining feed the eastern branch of the river. The largest glaciers feeding the eastern and western branches are Tshoju Glacier and Wachey Glacier respectively.

The Pho Chu flows towards Punakha, where it joins the Mo Chhu near the Punakha Dzong. The two rivers combine to form the Puna Tsang Chhu river at their confluence, and is joined by Tang Chu at Wangdue Phodrang. The Puna Tsang Chu later joins the Brahmaputra. The river supports freshwater fish species such as Schizothorax richardsonii and Salmo trutta.

== Ecology and climate change ==
Climate change has increased the risk of glacial lake outburst floods in the Pho Chhu basin as increasing temperatures had accelerated glacier retreat and led to the expansion of glacial lakes. As the river flows through several settlements, it poses a risk to downstream communities, agriculture, and other infrastructure. Since 2008, the Government of Bhutan, with the aid of United Nations Development Programme, has implemented adaptation measures aidmed at reducing the risk of such floods in the Punakha and Wangdue valleys.

== Cultural significance ==
In Bhutanese culture, the Pho Chhu and Mo Chhu are known as "father river", and "mother river" respectively. Situated at the confluence of Mo Chhu and Pho Chhu, the Punakha Dzong, constructed by Ngawang Namgyal in 1637–1638, is one of the important religious and political centres of Bhutan.
