= Mo Chhu =

Coordinates: 26°23′N 89°48′E

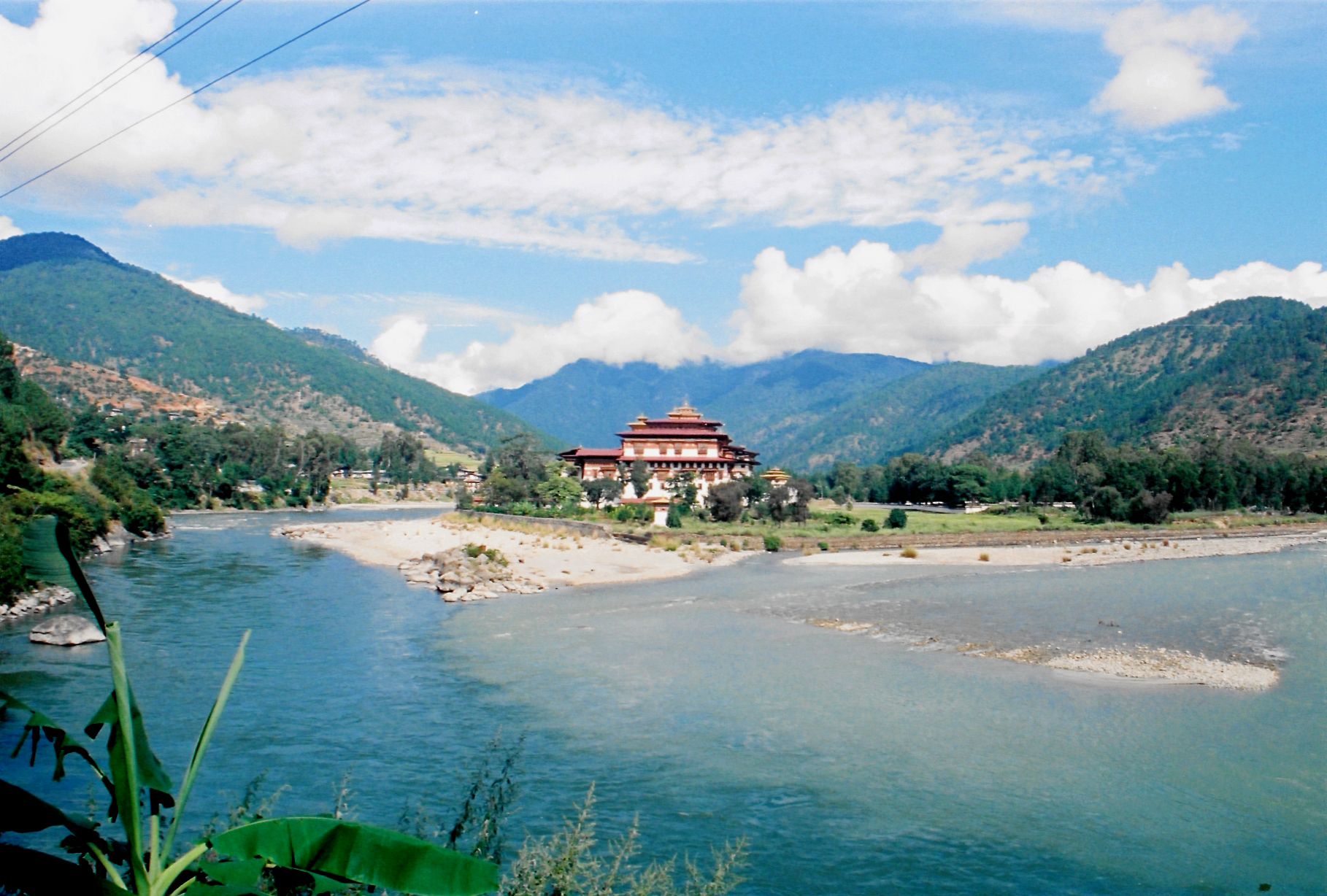
- Confluence of the Mo Chhu (left) and the Pho Chhu (right) below Punakha Dzong (center)

Location
- Country: Bhutan

Physical characteristics
- Source
  - location: Chomolhari
- Mouth
  - location: Puna Tsang Chhu

Mo Chhu is a major river in Bhutan. The river arises in the slopes of Chomolhari in the Himalayas and flows towards the Punakha valley. It is joined by the Pho Chhu near Punakha Dzong to form the Puna Tsang Chhu river, which forms part of the Brahmaputra river system.

== Course ==
The headwaters of the Mo Chhu are located in the hills of Laya and Lingzhi Gewogs in northern Bhutan. It originates from the northeastern slope of Chomolhari in the Himalayas. The river basin extends from the Tsenda Kang–Gangla Karchung in the east to the Kangphu Kang–Nile La–Nigile La mountains in the west. The Mo Chu Basin consists of 118 glaciers covering 169 km^{2} (65 sq mi) with an estimated ice reserve of 11.34 km^{3} (2.72 cu mi). There are also at least 380 lakes in the catchment area of the river.

The Mo Chu consists of two main branches. The eastern branch is formed by four smaller rivers–Mo Chu Kangu, Zamtognangi Chu, Taksikhai Chu, and Rodhophugi Chu. The Mo Chu Kangu is formed by Sinchhe Chu and Sagchhagi Chu originating from the Gangchhen Ta glacier. Kamgigi Chu and Sachhuphugi rivulets originating from Masagang and Khebechen glaciers respectively combine to form the Zamtognangi Chu. The western branch of the Mo Chu is made up of Lingshi Chu and Chhijethang Chu rivers, which originate from Takaphu and Gangchhen Ta glaciers respectively. The Gasa Chu is a major tributary of Mo Chu, which is formed by the confluence of Lingshi Chu and Chhijethang Chu rivers. The Gasa Chu joins the Mo Chu near Gasa.

The Mo Chu flows southwards towards Punakha, where it is joined by the Pho Chhu near the Punakha Dzong. The two rivers combine to form the Puna Tsang Chhu river, and is joined by Tang Chu at Wangdue Phodrang. The Puna Tsang Chu later joins the Brahmaputra. The Puna Tsang Chhu is one of Bhutan's principal river systems with a basin of 9,900 km^{2} (3,800 sq mi). The river supports freshwater fish species such as Schizothorax richardsonii and Salmo trutta.

== Cultural significance ==
In Bhutanese culture, the Mo Chhu and Pho Chhu are known as "mother river", and "father river" respectively. Situated at the confluence of Mo Chhu and Pho Chhu, the Punakha Dzong, constructed by Ngawang Namgyal in 1637–1638, is one of the important religious and political centres of Bhutan.
