= Lakes of Bhutan =

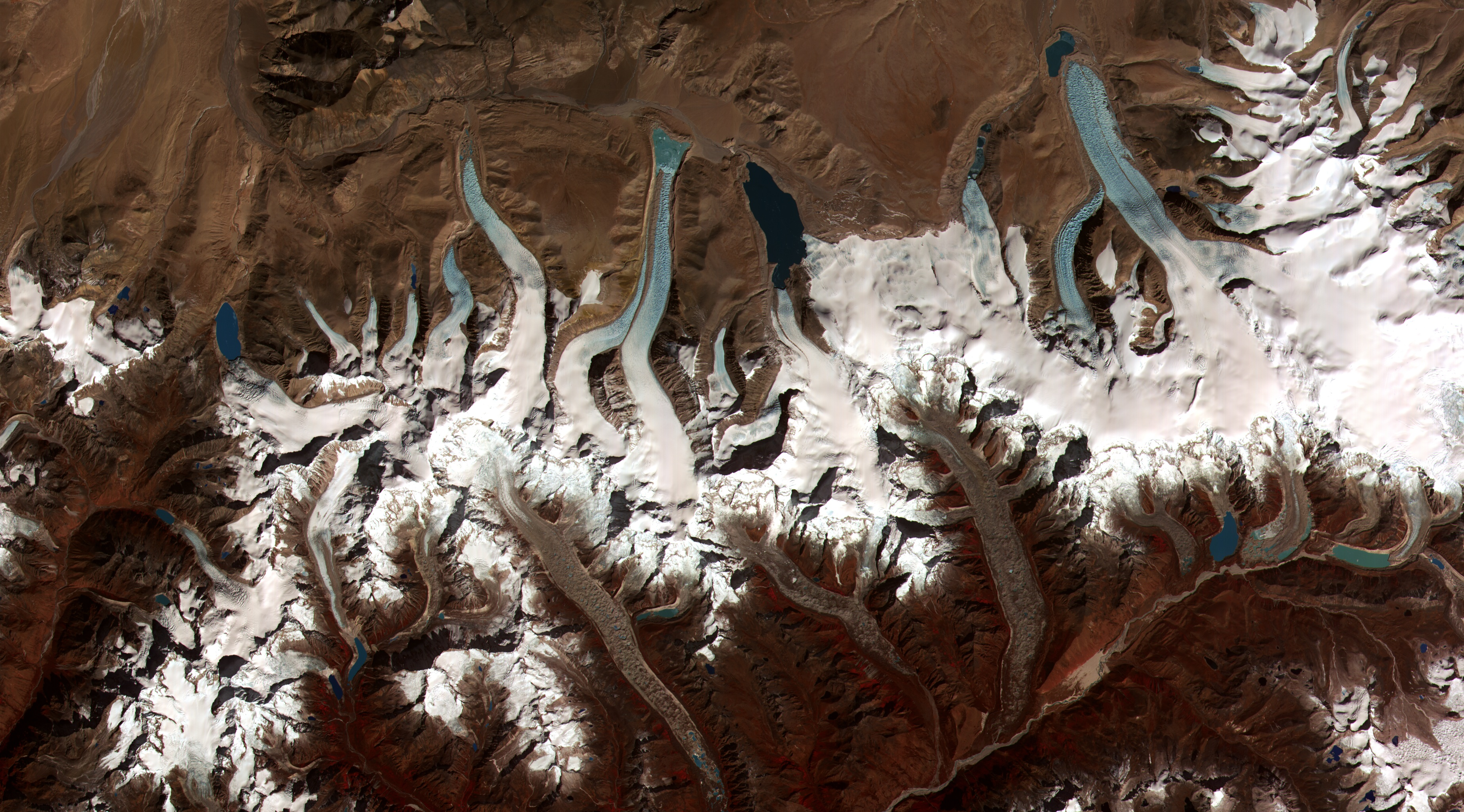
Glacial lakes in Bhutan (2002)

The lakes of Bhutan comprise its glacial lakes and its natural mountain lakes. Bhutanese territory contains some 2,674 high altitude glacial lakes and subsidiary lakes, out of which 25 pose a risk of GLOFs. There are also more than 59 natural non-glacial lakes in Bhutan, covering about 4,250 hectares (16.4 sq mi). Most are located above an altitude of 3,500 metres (11,500 ft), and most have no permanent human settlements nearby, though many are used for grazing yaks and may have scattered temporary settlements.

Only four lakes are below an altitude of 2,000 metres (6,600 ft): the temperate Kabji-Hoka Tsho in Punakha District at 1,829 metres (6,001 ft); Luchika in Wangdue Phodrang at 1,830 metres (6,000 ft); Buli Tsho in Zhemgang at 1,372 metres (4,501 ft); and the subtropical Gulandi in Samdrup Jongkhar at 366 metres (1,201 ft).

As phenomena of nature, all lakes in Bhutan are believed to be inhabited by spirits. A handful of lakes in Bhutan are particularly sacred, most often connected to lives of Buddhist saints Guru Rimpoche and Pema Lingpa. For example, Membar Tsho ("Burning Lake"), in the Tang Valley near Bumthang, is heavily associated with Guru Rimpoche, who brought Buddhism to Bhutan and discovered his first terma in the lake in 1475.

Most natural lake names are denoted with the word tsho, meaning "lake" (Dzongkha: མཚོ་; Wylie: mtsho). They may be identified as an individuals, pairs, or groups of lakes.

== Glaciers and glacial lakes ==
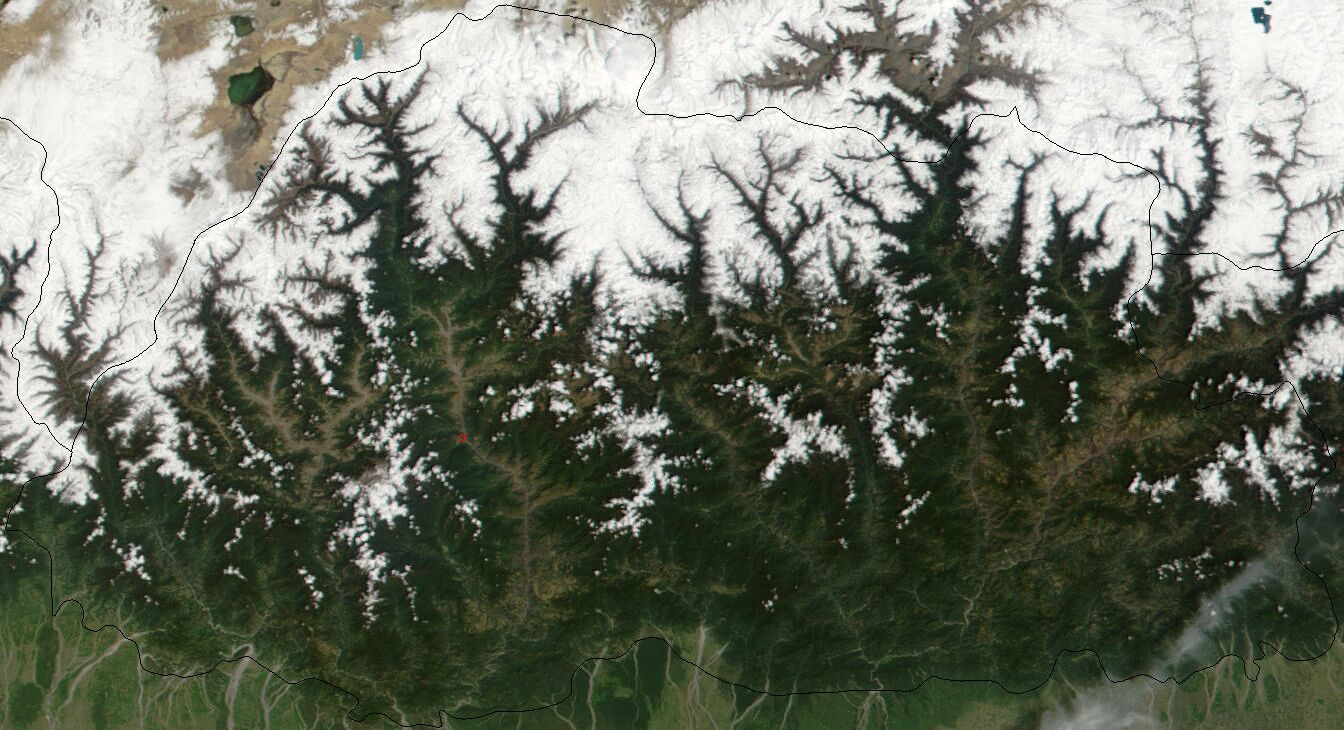
Satellite image of Bhutan (April 2002)

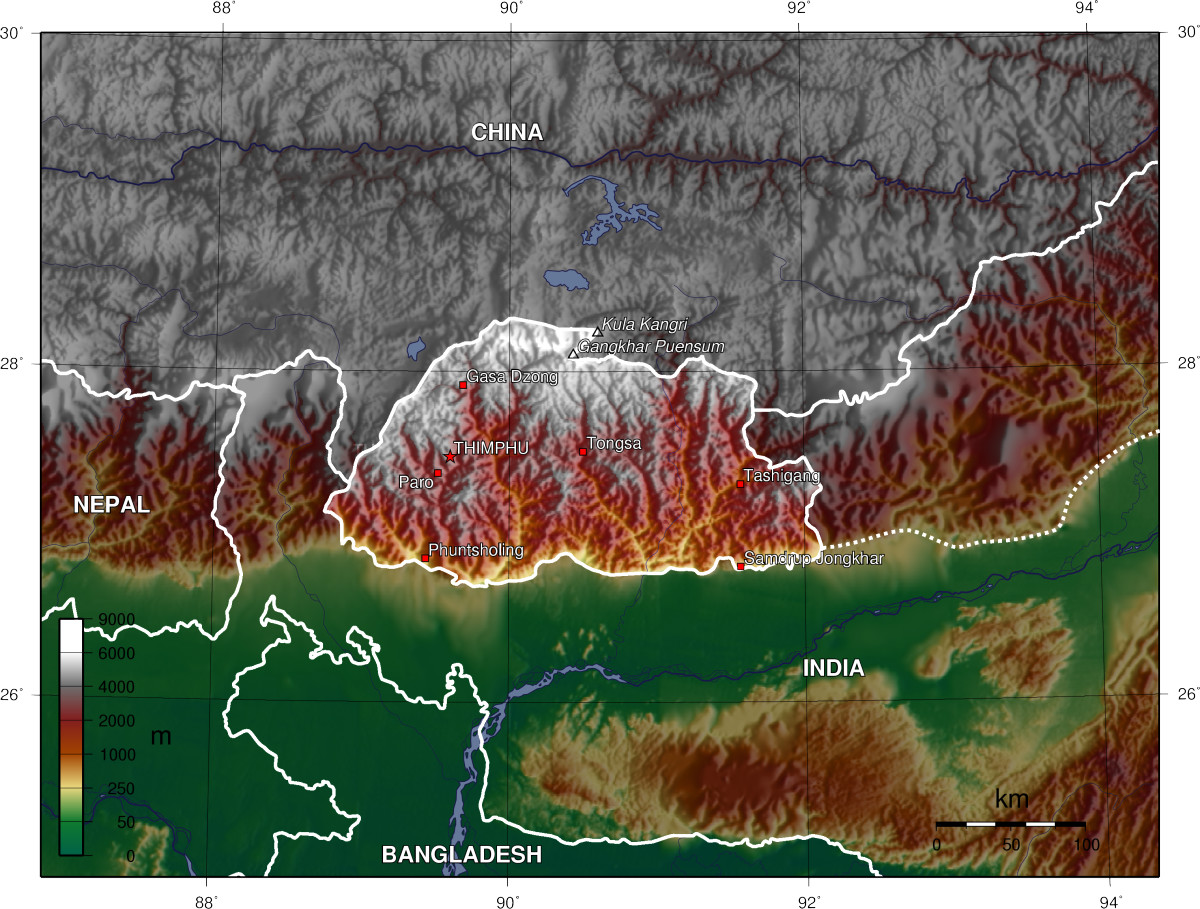
Topographical map of Bhutan (2006)

Glaciers in Bhutan cover a substantial portion of its northern regions.

Bhutan contains some 2,674 glacial lakes. Some glacial lakes, such as Thorthormi Lake in Lunana Gewog, are not a single bodies of water but collections supraglacial ponds. Most glacial lakes identified as potentially dangerous feed into the Manas River and Puna Tsang (Sankosh) River water systems of north-central Bhutan. During a GLOF, residents of nearby downstream villages may have as little as twenty minutes to evacuate; floodwaters from one 1994 GLOF at Luggye lake took about seven hours to reach Punakha, some 90 kilometres (56 mi) downstream.

Where glacial movement temporary blocks riverflows, downstream areas may be threatened by glacial lake outburst flood ("GLOFs"). Although GLOFs are not a new phenomenon in Bhutan, their frequency has risen in the past three decades. Significant GLOFs occurred in 1957, 1960, 1968 and 1994, devastating lives and property downstream. According to the Bhutan Department of Energy however, the majority of rivers in Bhutan are more susceptible to fluctuation with changing rainfall patterns than to flooding directly attributable to glacier or snow melt.

For public safety, these glaciers and glacial lakes are maintained by the Ministry of Economic Affairs' Department of Geology and Mines, an executive (cabinet) agency of the government of Bhutan. The Department, as part of its environmental "mitigation projects," aims to lower the levels of glacial lakes and thereby avert GLOF-related disaster. One such glacial lake mitigation project, for example, aimed to lower water levels by five meters over three years. The Department uses silent explosives and other means it considers environmentally friendly in order to minimize the ecological impact of its mitigation projects. These projects, however, remain difficult to conduct because of the weather, terrain, and relative lack of oxygen at the glacial lakes' altitudes. As of September 2010, GLOF early warning systems were slated for installation by mid-2011 in Punakha and Wangdue Phodrang Districts at a cost of USD4.2 million.

== Lists of lakes ==
=== List of non-glacial lakes ===
Naturally occurring mountain lakes, though today fewer than glacial lakes, include several historically and spiritually relevant bodies of water.

Lake name	District	Gewog	Notes
Animo Tsho	Bumthang District	Chhoekhor Gewog	Located near Dhur, Animo Tsho sits at an elevation of 4,375 metres (14,354 ft) on the road from Bumthang to Lunana. It is a holy lake where speech is forbidden.
Buli Tsho	Zhemgang District		The Buli sits at 1,372 metres (4,501 ft).
Chhiba Tsho	Dagana District		Chhiba Tsho is located below a pass at 4,500 metres (14,800 ft). On the other side of the pass lie Dagana Valley and the small, blue Langtsho ("Ox Lake").
Chungge Tsho	Bumthang District	Chhoekhor Gewog	Chungge Tsho is at an elevation of 4,400 metres (14,400 ft), near Lungsipang village.
Dagebho	Thimphu District	Soe Gewog	east Jomo lake group; its name means "longer than the archery range," and is also called Batsho.
Daja Tsho	Thimphu District	Soe Gewog	Jomo lake group; Daja Tsho is also called Serbho Tsho ("Golden Lake"). It lies along the Snowman Trek at 4,520 metres (14,830 ft)
Dangling Tsho	Trashigang District	Khaling Gewog	Located to the north of Khaling village, the lake is considered very sacred by the local people.
Djule Tsho	Bumthang District	Chhoekhor Gewog	Djule Tsho is located to the northwest of the sacred Animo Tsho at 4,190 metres (13,750 ft) near the Gongto La (Gokthong La) and Djule La passes. This pass marks the watershed of the Mangde Chhu (Trongsa Chhu), one of Bhutan's major river systems.
Dongney Tsho	Paro District	Tsento Gewog	Dongney Tsho is surrounded by fir trees, located on the trekking path to Drugyel Dzong.
Dongtsho	Thimphu District	Soe Gewog	east Jomo lake group.
Drakey Pangtsho	Paro District	Tsento Gewog	Drakey Pangtsho is a spiritual lake on the lap of Jowo Drake, where Guru Rinpoche had hidden sacred treasures in the 8th Century. This treasure lake is in the middle of a gently sloped rocky hill at an altitude of 4390 masl in the northern part of Paro Dzongkhag.
Dungtsho Tsho	Paro District	Doteng Gewog	Dungtsho Tsho and Dungtsho Sama, male and female lakes, respectively.
Gulandi Tsho	Samdrup Jongkhar District		The subtropical Gulandi sits at 366 metres (1,201 ft).
Kabji-Hoka Tsho	Punakha District		The Ho Ko Tsho sits at 1,829 metres (6,001 ft).
Janye Tsho	Thimphu District	Lingzhi Gewog	Janye, or Jane, Tsho rests at 3,956 metres (12,979 ft) along the Druk Path Trail between Jimilang Tsho and Simkotra Tsho. It is often occupied by yak herders.
Jatsho	Thimphu District	Soe Gewog	Jomo lake group; the largest lake of its group, its name ("Vulture Lake"), comes from its shape.
Jimilang Tsho	Thimphu District		Jimilang rests at an elevation of 3,870 metres (12,700 ft) at the apex of the Druk Path Trail. Its name means "Sand Ox Lake," named after a legendary bull. Also called Bimelang Tsho, this sacred lake is a meditation site. The lake contains many trout, and fishing there is allowed with permit.
Laname Tsho	Paro District	Tsento Gewog	Laname Tsho is near Laname La and Bonte La passes.
Langtsho	Dagana District		Langtsho ("Ox Lake") is a small lake adjacent to the Mangde Chhu watershed.
Luetshokha Tsho	Wangdue Phodrang District		Luetshokha sits at 1,830 metres (6,000 ft). The lake is located on the way to Samtengang village.
Membar Tsho	Bumthang District		"Burning Lake", in the Tang Valley near Bumthang, is heavily associated with Guru Rimpoche, who brought Buddhism to Bhutan and discovered his first terma in the lake in 1475.
Ngyetsho	Thimphu District	Soe Gewog	east Jomo lake group.
Nob Tshona Patta Tsho	Haa District	Uesu Gewog	Nob Tshona Patta Tsho is a treking destination from Haa to Paro near Lukha village.
Om Tsho	Trongsa District	Nubi Gewog	Om Tsho, also called Omtoe Tsho and Omta Tsho, lies at 4,665 metres (15,305 ft). It is a sacred lake, believed to be where Pema Lingpa found terton: cymbals, texts, and other artifacts hidden by Guru Rimpoche. There is a second smaller lake below the waterfall of Om Tsho at 4,150 metres (13,620 ft); both are located along the Snowman Trek.
Rigona Tsho	Paro District	Tsento Gewog	Rigona is near Nob Tshona Patta Tsho at 4,090 metres (13,420 ft).
Sertsho	Thimphu District	Soe Gewog	east Jomo lake group.
Sethag Burge Tsho	Gasa District	Laya Gewog	Also called Sistiha Phugi Tso, this lake lies below the enormous Tsenda Gang range.
Setsho	Gasa District	Lunana Gewog	Setsho lake is located southwest of Gonju La along the Ramena Trail near Woche
Simdong Goi Tso	Gasa District	Laya Gewog	This lake lies between Wochey and the Wagye La pass, the old route to Lhasa.
Simkotra Tsho	Thimphu District	Naro Gewog	Simkotra Tsho is located to the south of Jimilang Tsho along the Druk Path Trail at 4,090 metres (13,420 ft).
Solang Chhu	Bumthang District	Chhoekhor Gewog	Solang Chhu (Thole Tsho) is an alpine lake at 4,420 metres (14,500 ft) near Bopsar and Thole La pass.
Tampoe Tsho	Trongsa District	Nubi Gewog	Tampoe Tsho is a small lake near Om Tsho.
Tshochena Lake	Gasa District	Lunana Gewog	Tshochena is located along the Snowman Trek, at 4,970 metres (16,310 ft).
Tsho Phu	Paro District	Tsento Gewog	The Tsho Phu are a pair of lakes along the Snowman Trek at 4,380 metres (14,370 ft). Although they were stocked with brown trout in the 1960s, fishing there is prohibited.
Utsho Tsho	Thimphu	Soe Gewog	Jomo lake group; Utsho is also called Gewa Tsho ("Turquoise Lake"), and is the lowsest of the Jomo lakes.
Adha Tsho	Wangdue Phodrang	Athang Gewog	Ada Tsho is beautifully located within the warm broadleaved forest near a paddy field.

=== List of glacial lakes ===
Glacial lakes in Bhutan far outnumber other kinds of lakes, and pose a particular risk to those living downstream in the event of a GLOF. Many of these lakes have appeared or grown after climate change, and the frequency at which they emit flood waters has increased. in recent history.

Below is a list of the major glacial lakes in Bhutan. Many lakes appear in clusters, and may someday merge; for example, the numerous glacial lakes of Laya and Lunana Gewogs lie mostly within Jigme Dorji National Park along a handful of major glaciers.

Lake name	District	Gewog	Notes
Thorthormi Glacial Lake	Gasa District	Lunana Gewog	Thorthormi Lake appeared on its glacier sometime after 1967. It is the largest lake in Lunana, with a width of 30 metres (98 ft).
Raphstreng (Rapstreng) Glacial Lake	Gasa District	Lunana Gewog	This lake appeared on its glacier in 1958. It is just over 2 square kilometres (0.77 sq mi) and 107 metres (351 ft) deep.
Luggye (Lugge) Glacial Lake	Gasa District	Lunana Gewog	Luggye first appeared in 1967 atop its glacier. It has a depth of 142 metres (466 ft), and a width of 30 metres (98 ft). Luggye produced a significant GLOF in 1994.
Bechung Glacial Lake	Gasa District	Lunana Gewog	Supra-glacial lake.
Roduphu Glacial Lake	Gasa District	Laya Gewog	This lake feeds into the Mo Chhu (River) basin.
Sinchhe Glacial Lake	Gasa District	Laya Gewog	Sinchhe drains into the Mo Chhu (River) basin.
Gangchentag Glacial Lake	Gasa District	Laya Gewog	Located at the base of Gangchentag Mountain.
Wochey (Wachey) Glacial Lake	Gasa District	Laya Gewog	Wochey Lake lies at an altitude of 4,220 metres (13,850 ft), just below the Gokthong La pass, on the single longest glacier in Bhutan at 20.1 kilometres (12.5 mi).
Teri Kang Glacial Lake	Gasa District	Laya Gewog	This dam-reinforced lake produced a devastating GLOF in the 1960s, partially destroying Punakha Dzong.
Chubda Glacial Lake	Bumthang District		Located in the upper Chamkhar Chhu basin, this large supraglacial lake was identified as a potential danger in 2001.
Taksha Tsho Glacial Lake	Gasa District	Lunana Gewog	Taksha Tsho is 500 metres (1,600 ft) in diameter and 110 metres (360 ft) deep.
Tsokar Glacial Lake	Bumthang District		Glacial lake in the basin.

== See also ==
- Geography of Bhutan
- Glaciers of Bhutan
- List of rivers of Bhutan
