= Khatoed Gewog =

Khatoed Goenkhatoe
- Gewog
- Coordinates: 27°50′N 89°38′E
- Country: Bhutan
- District: Gasa
- Seat: Jasithangkha

Area
  - Total: 326 km^{2} (126 sq mi)

Population (2005)
  - Total: 194
  - Density: 0.595/km^{2} (1.54/sq mi)
- Time zone: UTC+6 (BTT)

Khatoed (Dzongkha: ཁ་སྟོད་རྒེད་འོག) is a gewog in Gasa District, Bhutan. Spread over an area of 326 km^{2} (126 sq mi), it had a population of 194 in 2005. The Gasa Dzong, the administrative center of the district, is located in the gewog.

== Geography ==
Khatoed, earlier known as Goenkhatoe, is one of the four gewogs in Gasa District (dzgongkhag). Spread over an area of 326 km^{2} (126 sq mi), it is the second smallest gewog by area in the district. It is further divided into five chiwogs. It is located in the southwest part of the district and is bordered by Laya Gewog to the north, Khamaed Gewog to the south, and Lunana Gewog to the west. The seat of the gewog is located at Jasithangkha. The entire Gasa district falls under the jurisdiction of Jigme Dorji National Park.

The Gasa Dzong, the administrative center of the district, is located at Gasa in the gewog. The dzong was built in the 17th century by Tenzin Drukdra on the site used by Terkhungpa to defend against invasions from the north.

Gasa Tshachu, are a set of hot springs located on the banks of the Mo Chhu River in the gewog. There are twelve pools with varying water temperatures. According to local lore, the hot sprints were established by Drubthob Terkhungpa in the 13th century, and is said to possess pharmacological properties.

As per the climate data for Gasa in 2017, the average temperature was the highest at 19.9 °C (67.8 °F) in September and lowest at 8.9 °C (48.0 °F) in January.

== Demographics and economy ==
As of 2005, Khatoed gewog had a population of 326 including 232 males and 212 females. The population is spread across 59 households. It is the smallest gewog by population in the district.

In the late 2010s, farmers were provided with modern farming machinery and several improvements were made to boost productivity, which helped scale up agricultural output in the gewog. The local population is involved in collecting Cordyceps (fungi) and about 100.86 kg (222.4 lb) were put up for auction in 2026, the highest amongst the gewogs in the district.

== Culture ==
The annual Gasa Tshechu festival is celebrated from the 8th to the 10th day of the second month of the Lunar Calendar. The first day of the festival is hosted at the Buddhist temple of Phulakha Lhakhang near the Gasa Dzong. The festivities include the enactment of various art forms including Goen Zhey, a dance drama, which originated during the times of Ngawang Namgyal in the 17th century. The highland communities of Gasa also perform unique local folk dances. Other important festivities include the Mahakala festival, celebrated on the 29th day of the tenth month, where gun salutations are offered to the god.
