= Khamaed Gewog =

Khamaed Goenkhamae
- Gewog
- Location on map of Bhutan
- Coordinates: 27°45′N 89°40′E
- Country: Bhutan
- District: Gasa
- Seat: Damji

Area
  - Total: 148.9 km^{2} (57.5 sq mi)

Population (2005)
  - Total: 1,057
  - Density: 7.099/km^{2} (18.39/sq mi)
- Time zone: UTC+6 (BTT)

Khamaed (Dzongkha: ཁ་སྨད་རྒེད་འོག) is a gewog in Gasa District, Bhutan. Its seat is located at Damji. Spread over an area of 148.9 km^{2} (57.5 sq mi), it had a population of 1,057 inhabitants in 2005.

== Geography ==
Khamaed, earlier known as Goenkhamae, is one of the four gewogs in Gasa District. Spread over an area of 148.9 km^{2} (57.5 sq mi), it is the smallest gewog by area in the district. It is further divided into five chiwogs and 30 villages. It is located in the southwest part of the district and is bordered by Khatoed Gewog to the west, and Lunana Gewog to the north. The seat of the gewog is located at Damji. The entire gewog falls under the jurisdiction of Jigme Dorji National Park. The gewog consists of 293.68 acres (118.85 ha) of wetlands and 151.86 acres (61.46 ha) of dry lands.

== Demographics and culture ==
As of 2005, Khamoed gewog had a population of 1,057 inhabitants including 562 males and 495 females. The population is spread across 114 households across the five chiwogs.

Rice and potato are the major crops grown in the gewog. Due to limited arable land, agricultural output was poor. In the late 2010s, farmers were provided with modern farming machinery and several improvements were made to boost productivity, which helped scale up farm outputs. The local population is involved in collecting Cordyceps (fungi) and about 567 collectors were recorded in the gewog in 2026, the highest in the country.

The gewog hosts a Buddhist school (Sibji Goenpa Shetra), and lhakhangs (Buddhist temples) such as Basha Lhakhang, Khailo Lhakhang, and Sab gabi Lhakhang. Bjishong Central School, the only high school in the district, is located at Damji.
