= Snowman Trek =

Hiking trail in Bhutan

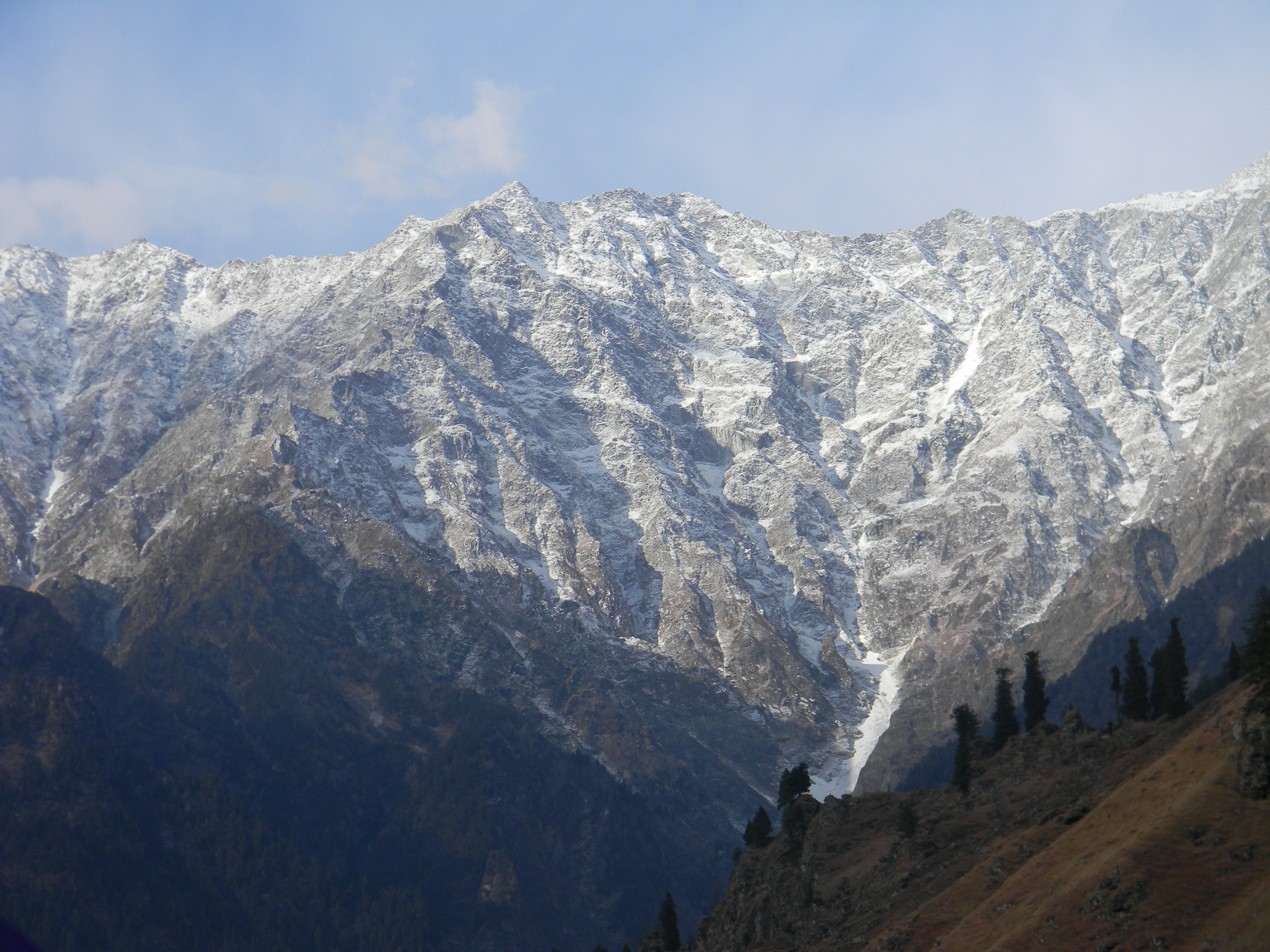
- Length: 347 km (216 mi)
- Location: Lunana, Gasa District, Wangdue Phodrang District, Sephu Gewog, Trongsa District, Bumthang District
- Use: Hiking
- Highest point: 5,230 m (17,160 ft)
- Lowest point: 2,850 m (9,350 ft)
- Difficulty: Hard
- Season: Summer
- Months: June, July, August, September, October
- Hazards: Altitude sickness, Severe weather

The Snowman Trek is the longest hiking trail of Bhutan that extends from Laya to the high Bhutanese Himalayas, covering up the northern part of the Kingdom. It was created by the yak herders of the country.

It is one of the hardest trekking trails due to hard weather, duration, and altitude in the world and most of the trekkers do not complete the route. It begins from Lunana to higher up in Gangkar Puensum, and ends in Trongsa and from there to Bumthang District, taking through the rough paths of the Himalayas and up to as high as 5000m above sea level. The route leads through remote villages, lakes, eleven mountain passes and overlooks some of the highest mountains of the Kingdom like Jomolhari, Jichu Drake, Gangkar Puensum, Masangang and Tiger Mountain. It was also reported that the snow leopards can be found on the way, although there has been no reports of danger to trekkers.

== Race ==
In 2022 it was run as an ultra marathon, known as the Snowman Race, over 5 days by 29 competitors. At least 12 competitors developed altitude sickness and thus did not finish. A second event is being planned for October 2024 with a distance of 196 km over 4 days with a maximum elevation of 5,470 m and 15 competitors.
