= Laya dialect =

Language spoken in Bhutan

Laya
- ལ་ཡ་ཁ་, layakha
- Native to: Bhutan
- Region: Laya Gewog, Gasa District; northern Punakha District; Lingzhi Gewog, Thimphu District
- Ethnicity: Layap
- Native speakers: 1,100 (2003)
- Language family: Sino-Tibetan: Tibeto-Burman; Tibeto-Kanauri (?); Bodish; Tibetic; Dzongkha–Lhokä; Dzongkha; Laya
- Writing system: Tibetan

Language codes
- ISO 639-3: lya
- Glottolog: laya1253

Laya (Dzongkha: ལ་ཡ་ཁ་, ལ་ཡག་ཁ་; Wylie: la-ya-kha, la-yag-kha) is a Tibetic variety spoken by indigenous Layaps inhabiting the high mountains of northwest Bhutan in the village of Laya, Gasa District. Speakers also inhabit the northern regions of Thimphu (Lingzhi Gewog) and Punakha Districts. Its speakers are ethnically related to the Tibetans. Most speakers live at an altitude of 3,850 metres (12,630 ft), just below the Tsendagang peak. Laya speakers are also called Bjop by the Bhutanese, sometimes considered a condescending term. There were 1,100 speakers of Laya in 2003.

Laya is a variety of Dzongkha, the national language of Bhutan. There is a limited mutual intelligibility with Dzongkha, mostly in basic vocabulary and grammar.

== See also ==
- Layap
- Laya Gewog
- Laya village
- Languages of Bhutan
