= Kunzangdrak Monastery =

Kungzandrak
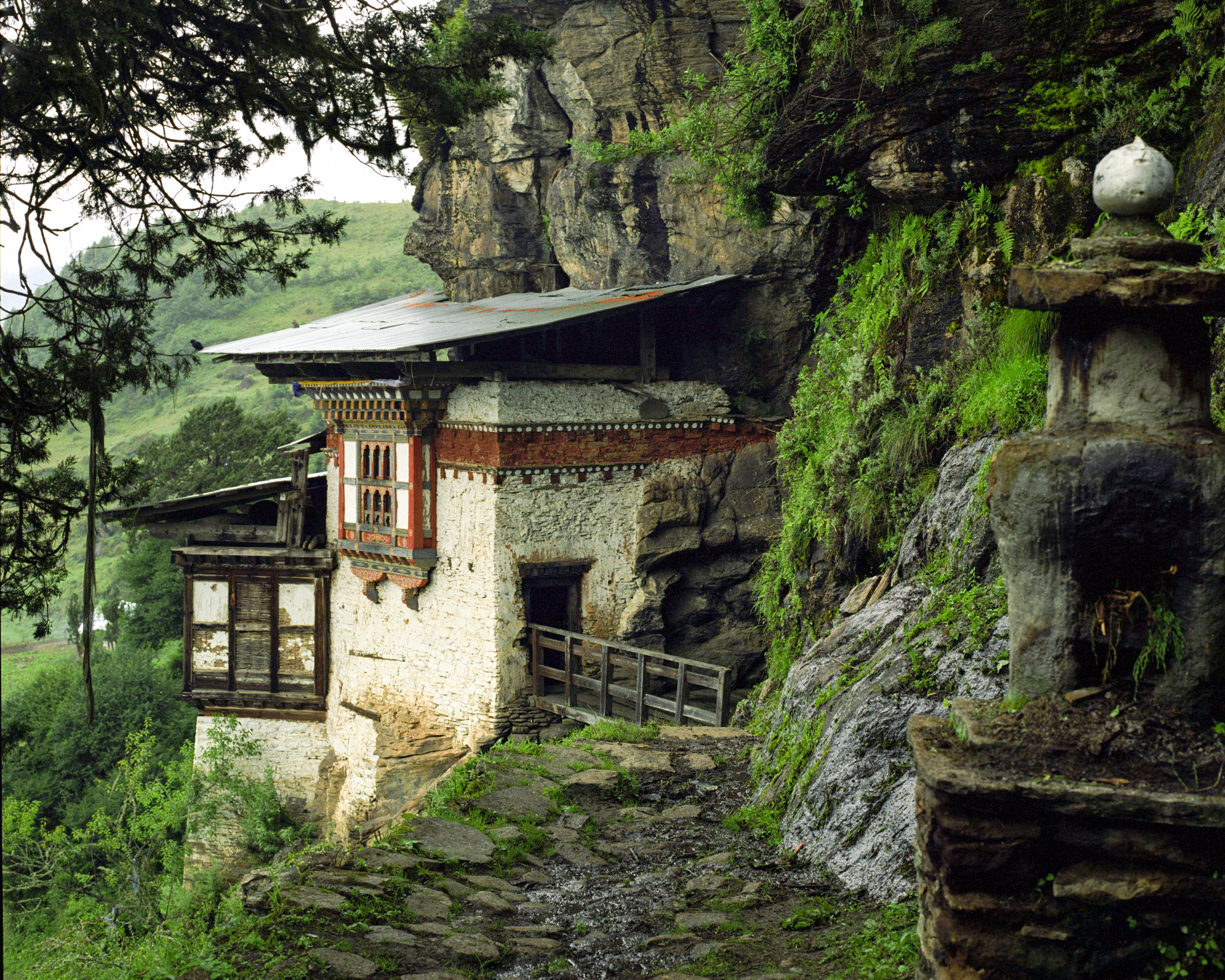

- Location within Bhutan

Religion
- Affiliation: Tibetan Buddhism
- Sect: Nyingma

Location
- Location: Tang Valley, Bhutan
- Country: Bhutan
- Interactive map of Kungzandrak
- Coordinates: 27°32′43″N 90°48′05″E

Architecture
- Founder: Pema Lingpa
- Established: 1488; 538 years ago

Kunzangdrak (Tibetan: ཀུན་བཟང་བྲག་, Wylie: kun bzang brag) is a Buddhist sacred site in the Tang Valley of central Bhutan. It lies at an altitude of 3,350 metres (10,990 feet) in the hollow of a cliff.

Kunzangdra is 19 km from Chamkhar Town and takes a half-hour hike to reach there on foot from the road end. It is one of the four sacred cliffs of Guru Rinpoche in Bumthang. The other three are Choedrak, Shukdrak and Thowadrak.

== History ==
Guru Rinpoche and his disciple Namkhai Nyingpo are said to have meditated here at the end of the 8th century. The current temple, however, was established in 1488 by Pema Lingpa. Aside from Pema Lingpa's living quarters, the site consists of three temples, the Wangkhang, which has the main statue of Avalokiteshvara with a thousand eyes and a thousand hands,Özerphug, the meditation cave of Pema Lingpa's son, Thuksey Dawa Gyeltsen (ཐུགས་སྲས་ཟླ་བ་རྒྱལ་མཚན) and the Khandroma Lhakang, which contains a gilded copper statue of Pema Lingpa.

== See also ==
- Choedrak Monastery
- Shuk Drak Goenpa
- Thowadrak Monastery
