= Gasa, Bhutan =

Gasa
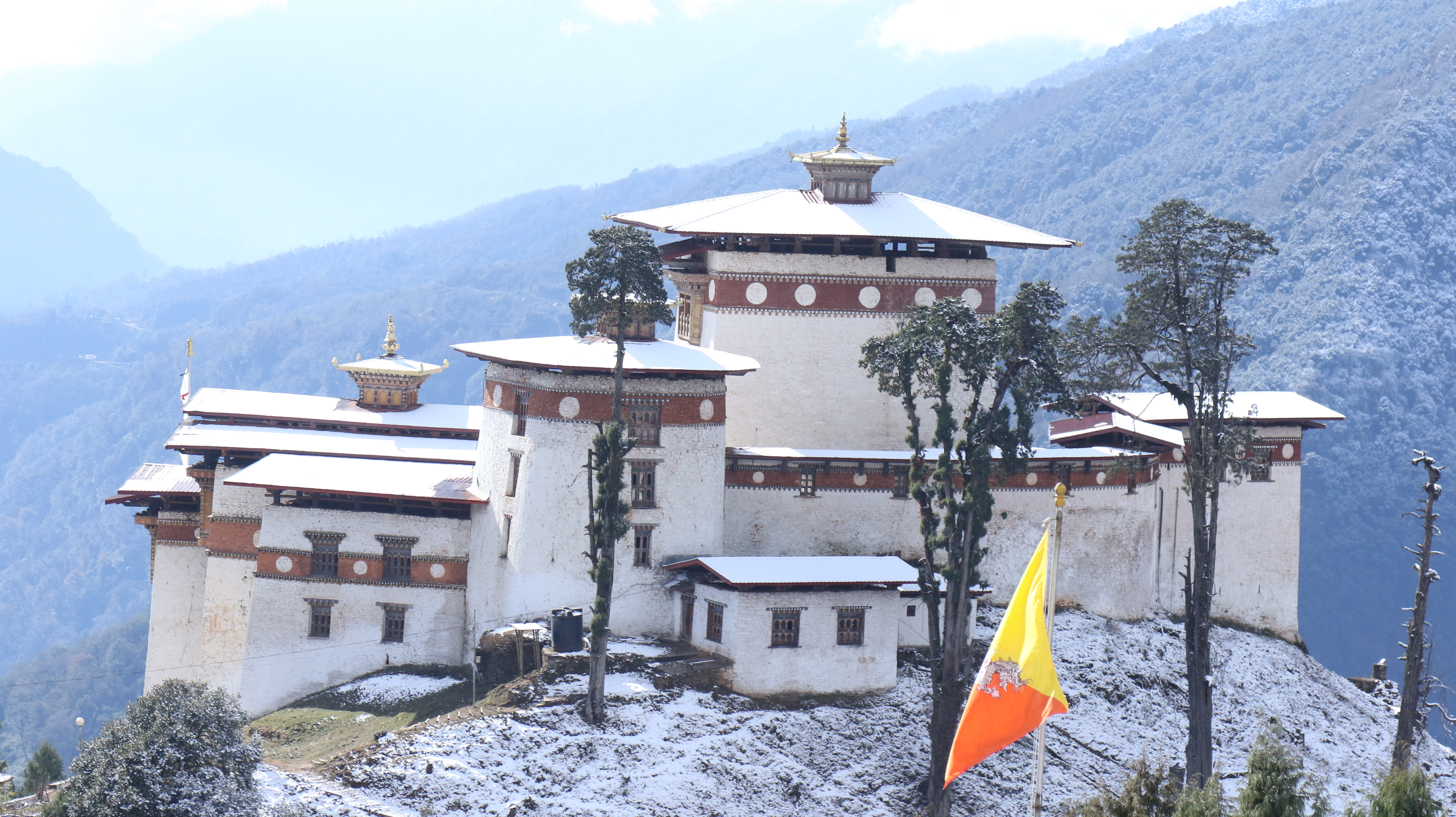
- The view of highlander

- Location in Bhutan
- Coordinates: 27°55′N 89°41′E
- Country: Bhutan
- District: Gasa District

Government The Government at the centre is supported by local governments in all the 20 districts / dzongkhags
  - Type: Local Government / Dzongkhag Tshogdu
  - Chairperson / Thrizin: Kinley
  - Governor / Dzongda: Sonam Jigme
  - Member of Parliament (National Council): Sangay Khandu
  - Member of Parliament (National Assembly): Damcho Dorji
  - Member of Parliament (National Assembly): Kinley Dorji

Population (2005)
  - Total: 3,116
- Time zone: UTC+6 (BTT)
- Website: www.gasadzongkhag.gov.bt, www.nab.gov.bt, www.nationalcouncil.bt

Gasa is a town near Gasa Dzong in Gasa District in northwestern Bhutan.

At the 2005 census, its population was 3,116. One of the twenty Dzongkhags (districts) of Bhutan, Gasa is an important northern Dzongkhag bordering Tibet. The place was visited and blessed by Ugyen Guru Rinpoche in the past, the close disciples of Tsangpa Gyare from the thirteenth century, the Indian Pandita Nagi Rinchen, and the numerous saints of the different schools of Buddhism from Tibet. It is also the place where Jamyang Lordo Senge, the eighth in line of the Senge Lineage, who was the Lord of the golden throne of Ralung in Tibet, was born. It is on the main route between Bhutan and Tibet and, also it was wars between the two countries. Unfortunately, they bring wars. The winning from the third legion of the Tibetan and Mongolian Army in 1656-1657 during the time of Tenzin Drukdra the second Desi. In Gasa they are many names of Gasa valley. The name which was later used for Gasa Dzong. It is the dwelling place of Damchen Gomo chargerlchen, the protector of Drubthop Trekhungpa, a siddha, visited the land of medicinal herbs Bhutan around the thirteenth century. It is the home to layaps, a nomadic tribe which earns revenue by selling products made from yaks. Gasa is famous for its hot springs, dzong snowman trek and royal highlander festival.

== Gasa Dzong ==
Gasa dzong was built to mark a victory over Tibetans, and further defend the country against invasions during the 17th and 18th centuries. Located at an elevation of about 2800m, the Dzong was said to have been built by Zhabdrung Namgyal in the 1640s above the cave meditated by Tibetan saint Terkhungpa. The Gasa Dzong played as a Shielding camp in the 17th century, and was named after the district's protecting deity Tashi Thongmon. The fortresses are different with a circular build and three watch towers that are located at vital places. The local residents say that Terkhungpa, who was skilled in iron works, lived and worked in the area, known as Garasa, which literally means ''the land of black smith". The three Ta Dzongs were destroyed twice by fire. The central ta dzong is located at the left side of the utse, while the other two are located about fifty meters to the left and right side of the central ta dzongs.

== Highlander ==
In Bhutan, at the heart of highland pastoralist life are two important aspects of life: the yaks and the mountains. Everything that is important centers around these two important aspects that make life both possible and worthwhile. Pastoralism often depends on land that is fragile because of its semi-arid or arid nature.

Here widespread agriculture is not possible or desirable due to the climatic and soil conditions. Highland pastoralists will come down to pastures at lower altitudes with their yaks herds and horses during the harsh winter. Only they return in the highlands during the summer months.
