= Ngang Lhakhang =

- Location within Bhutan

Religion
- Affiliation: Tibetan Buddhism

Location
- Location: Bhutan
- Country: Bhutan
- Interactive map of Ngang Lhakhang
- Coordinates: 27°38′54″N 90°45′20″E

Ngang Lhakhang is a Buddhist monastery in the Choekhor Valley of central Bhutan. It is located not for from Draphe Dzong, which was the residence of the Choekhor Penlop who was ruling the valley before the Drukpa conquest in the 17th century. Also known as the "Swan temple", Ngang lies on the right side of the valley. It is a private temple, built in the 16th century by a Tibetan lama named Namkha Samdrup, who also built Namkhoe Lhakhang in the Tang Valley. Today it is a residence and in 2004 was enlarged with four guest rooms.
