= Lecanora ulrikii =

Scientific classification
- Kingdom: Fungi
- Division: Ascomycota
- Class: Lecanoromycetes
- Order: Lecanorales
- Family: Lecanoraceae
- Genus: Lecanora
- Species: L. ulrikii

Binomial name
- Lecanora ulrikii Papong & Lumbsch (2010)
- Holotype: Doi Inthanon National Park, Thailand

Species of lichen

Lecanora ulrikii is a species of crustose lichen in the family Lecanoraceae. It was described in 2011 from collections made in the Himalayan kingdom of Bhutan and in northern Thailand. Distinguished by its relatively large, orange-brown fruiting discs that sit in a narrow "waist", the species also produces a characteristic suite of secondary metabolites—atranorin, usnic acid and isoarthothelin—that aid chemical identification.

== Taxonomy ==
The species was formally described by the lichenologists Khwanruan Papong and H. Thorsten Lumbsch in 2010, with the holotype gathered from montane cloud forest at 2356 metres elevation on Doi Inthanon, Chiang Mai Province, Thailand. The specific epithet honours the Danish lichenologist Ulrik Søchting, who collected a series of Bhutanese specimens. Molecular data for the genus as a whole show that the traditional circumscription of Lecanora is heterogeneous, but L. ulrikii falls within the well-supported "Lecanora sensu stricto – subfusca" clade characterised by calcium oxalate crystals in the thallus and the frequent presence of usnic acid.

== Description ==
The lichen forms a thin, continuous to slightly warted (verrucose) thallus that is matt and ranges from whitish-grey to yellowish-grey. It lacks specialised asexual propagules such as soredia or isidia, so dispersal relies on sexual structures.

Apothecia (open, disc-shaped fruiting bodies) are sessile and conspicuously constricted at the base, giving each disc a perched-on-a-pedestal appearance. They measure 0.4–1.2 mm across, with a shiny, orange-brown to brown disc and a thick rim made of thallus tissue (a lecanorine margin). Under the microscope, the outer wall (amphithecium) is packed with coarse and fine calcium oxalate crystals, while the spore-bearing layer (hymenium) may be clear or contain oil droplets. Eight colourless, ellipsoid to sausage-shaped ascospores, measuring 15–17 × 6–7.5 μm, develop in each ascus.

High-performance thin-layer chromatography analysis of the lichen detects atranorin, usnic acid and isoarthothelin as major metabolites, with several trace chlorinated xanthones.

== Habitat and distribution ==
Lecanora ulrikii grows on the bark of living trees, especially twigs, in upper-montane evergreen forests. Confirmed records span elevations of roughly 1500–3850 m in Bhutan (e.g. Thimphu District and the Jimilang Tsho area) and Thailand (on Doi Inthanon and in the Phu Luang Wildlife Sanctuary). The species appears to favour the cool, humid conditions typical of cloud forest belts in south-east Asia; its full range may be wider, but similar habitats in the region remain poorly surveyed.

== See also ==
- List of Lecanora species
