= Choedrak Monastery =

Monastery in Bumthang, Bhutan

- Location within Bhutan

Religion
- Affiliation: Tibetan Buddhism

Location
- Location: Bumthang District
- Country: Bhutan
- Coordinates: 27.53°N 90.69°E

Architecture
- Founder: Lorepa
- Established: 1234; 792 years ago

Choedrak Monastery is a Buddhist monastery in Bhutan, located at an altitude of 3,800 metres, not far from Tharpaling Monastery in Bumthang District. Guru Rinpoche is said to have meditated at this spot.

It is 37 kilometers from Chamkhar and takes one hour to reach from the motorable road end at Tharpaling monastery. Choedrak Goenpa can also be reached after three-hour hike from Lamey Goenpa in Choekhor Valley. It is one of the four sacred cliffs of Guru Rinpoche in Bumthang. The other three are Kunzangdrak, Shukdrak and Thowadrak.

== History ==
In 1234, Lorepa, a Drukpa Kagyupa lama from Tibet build a temple here and resided in it. However, after he returned to Tibet, the temple was said to have been besieged by evil spirits. According to his biography, it was renovated by Damcho Pekar (later 4th Je Khenpo) after his return from Nepal. It was repaired by Ngawang Trinley, an eminent monk from Siula Monastery in the Punakha region.

The sacred relics seen at Choedrak are a sacred cliff where Guru Rinpoche meditated, imprints of Guru and his tigress, stone throne of Guru Rinpoche, sacred Stone with the footprint of Khandrom, sacred Khandro Dorje Yudronma’s Drupchu and kudung Chorten of Geshe Tempa Rinchen.

== See also ==
- Kunzangdrak Monastery
- Shuk Drak Goenpa
- Thowadrak Monastery
