= Laya, Bhutan =

Laya
- Location in Bhutan
- Coordinates: 28°4′N 89°41′E
- Country: Bhutan
- District: Gasa District

Population
  - Total: 3,000
- Time zone: UTC+6 (BTT)

Laya is a town in Laya Gewog in Gasa District in northwestern Bhutan. It is inhabited by the indigenous Layap people, and is the highest settlement in the country at 3,820 meters (12,533 feet) above sea level.

== See also ==
- List of highest towns by country
