= Layap =

Ethnic group

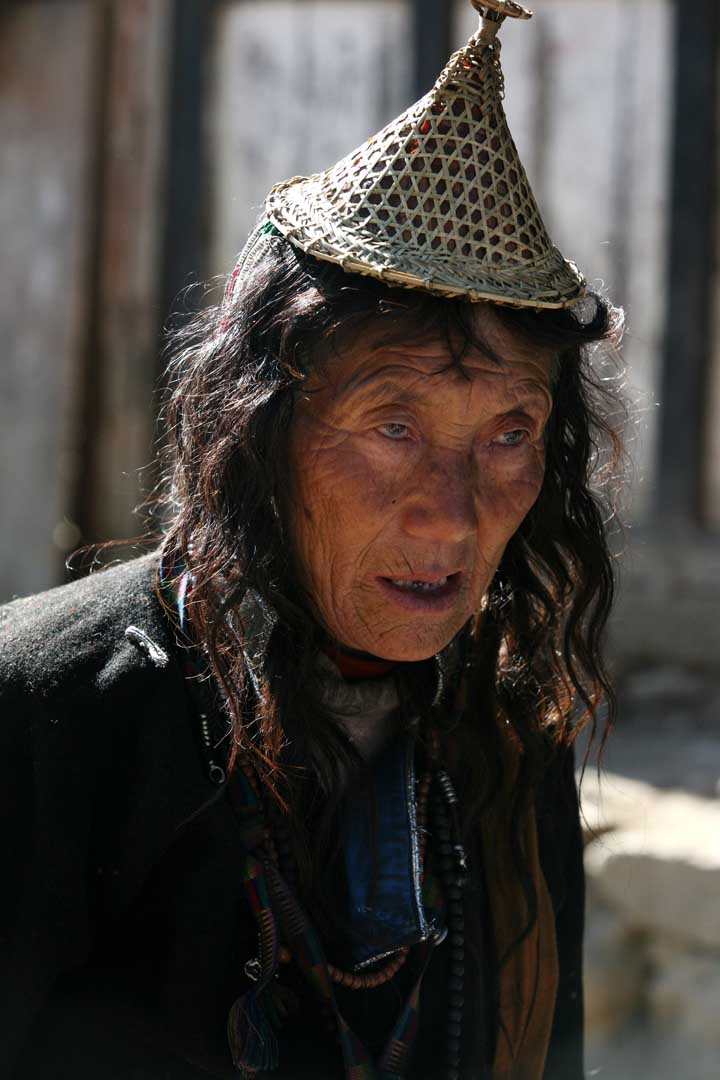
- Laya woman in Laya Gewog

Total population
- 1,100 (2003)

Regions with significant populations
- Bhutan (Gasa, Punakha, Thimphu Districts)

Languages
- Layakha, Dzongkha

Religion
- Buddhism, Bön (shamanism)

Related ethnic groups
- Ngalops, Lhops, Tibetans

The Layap (Dzongkha: ལ་ཡཔ་) are an indigenous people inhabiting the high mountains of northwest Bhutan in the village of Laya, in the Gasa District, at an altitude of 3,850 metres (12,630 ft), just below the Tsendagang peak. Their population in 2003 stood at 1,100. They speak Layakha, a Tibeto-Burman language. Layaps refer to their homeland as Be-yul – "the hidden land."

== Dress ==
Men wear the Bhutanese costume, which consists of a silk or linen garment that is typically colored saffron and red (cf. gho), the women wear black woolen jackets, which reach right down to the ankles. A blue pattern band may also be found at the bottom of their long sleeves.

== Religion ==
The Layap practice a mixture of Bon and Tibetan Buddhism. According to legend, Laya village is the spot where Ngawang Namgyal, the founder of Bhutan, first entered the country.

Particularly unique among the Layap is the extensive tradition of "living defilements" (Dzongkha: soen drep), whereby a ritually impure person is ostracized from social activities. The Layap shun "living defilements" in order not to anger deities, and to avoid physical maladies and livestock plagues. Among ritually impure acts are birth, divorce, and death, including the death of a horse.

== Lifestyle ==
Located near the Tibetan border, the Layap have traditionally engaged in trade. Nowadays that includes the smuggling of bootleg Chinese blankets and plastic goods which are embargoed by the Bhutanese government, but in much demand by Bhutanese villagers.

Traditionally, the Layap lived a semi-nomadic lifestyle, who rearing yaks and dzos, although in recent times small ponies may also be found in the area. Owing to the cold weather at this altitude, few crops can be planted, except for some grasses. Layaps also traditionally pick cordyceps, valuable traditionally medicinal and magical fungi native to the region. With Bhutan's increased environmental protection, Layaps and rural farmers face more challenges protecting their livestock from natural predators, particularly leopards. Layap people also participate in the heavy labor to drain Thorthormi, a glacial lake prone to GLOF flooding. Flooding is a particularly serious threat to the Layap way of life, heavily dependent on livestock and sparse water resources.

Until the 1980s, the Layap lived in near-complete isolation from the world, except for occasional visits to Thimphu or Punakha, which was a five-day walk. Since the new millennium, Laya has been visited by tourists from all over the world. One can see beautifully painted houses fitted with solar panels, and the construction of new schools for the impoverished children. Most villagers are now able to abandon the village in the winter and return in the springtime. Many Layaps now live in permanent settlements complete with modern amenities – from toilets to mobile phones and televisions – thanks to disposable incomes from business and trade. Increasingly, Layap children are attending Bhutanese schools.

Though somewhat modernized, Layaps and other tribal peoples of Bhutan remain a curiosity to the majority of the native population, many of whom lead much more modernized lives. The government encourages pride among Bhutan's tribal groups, and cites them as an example of humans successfully living in harmony with nature.

In traditional Layap culture, casual sex is commonplace and accepted among both males and females, unmarried and married. As a consequence, Layap communities face enormous exposure to syphilis, gonorrhoea, and hepatitis B. Although condoms were somewhat available, almost no Layaps reported safer sex practices through 2009, a trend the government hopes to buffet.

== Marriage and family ==
The Layap are known for their tradition of polyandry, practiced to keep families and property together, although the custom now in decline. The Layap also have a tradition of child marriage, with brides as young as 10 years old. Layap women speaking to media anticipate the increase in schooling among their daughters will result in a decline in child marriages. Many Layap women find healthcare difficult to access during pregnancy due to isolated settlements and nomadic lifestyles. Among the foremost concerns for Layap women is prenatal care.

== See also ==
- Layakha
- Laya Gewog
- Laya village
