= Lunana =

Lunana ལུང་ནག་ན
- Location in Bhutan
- Coordinates: 28°3′N 90°10′E
- Country: Bhutan
- District: Gasa District
- Gewog: Lunana Gewog
- Time zone: UTC+6 (BTT)

Lunana (Dzongkha: ལུང་ནག་ན) is a remote village in Gasa District in northwestern Bhutan. It is the capital of Lunana Gewog, which had a 2014 population of 810.

It is the setting for the film Lunana: A Yak in the Classroom.

Local people sell cattle and caterpillar fungus, and grow small amounts of wheat, buckwheat, potatoes, radishes, and turnips. Some spend winters in valleys at lower altitudes. Lunana gets two meters (80 inches) of precipitation per year. The people maintain a traditional culture.

== See also ==
- Lunanakha
