= Shuk Drak Goenpa =

Buddhist monastery in Bumthang district, Bhutan

- Location within Bhutan

Religion
- Affiliation: Tibetan Buddhism

Location
- Location: Bumthang District
- Country: Bhutan
- Interactive map of Shuk Drak Goenpa
- Coordinates: 27°38′29.67586″N 90°42′52.9261″E

Architecture
- Founder: Garpa Nado
- Established: 1944

Shuk Drak Goenpa (Dzongkha: ཤུག་བྲག་དགོན་པ, romanized: shug brag dgon pa) is a Buddhist monastery in Bhutan, located at an altitude of 2680 metres in Kharsa village of Bumthang District. Shuk Drak is one of four sacred cliffs of Guru Rinpoche where he mediated to gain the power to subdue the local deity Sheling Karpo in the 8th century. The other three are Choedrak, Kunzangdrak and Thowadrak. It is a 45-minute drive from Chamkhar town to the base of the site and a 20-minute walk uphill. It will just take 30 minutes if you walk from Kharsa Primary School.

== History ==
According to the biography of King Sindhu Raja, called The Clear Mirror, Guru Rinpoche is said to have arrived there in the form of Blood Drinking Wrathful Padma, meditated and concealed many treasures. Some of the sacred wonders to see are footprint of Guru Rinpoche and his walking stick, footprint of Khandro Yeshe Tshogyal and many more.

Shuk Drak Goenpa is known by many names like Chung drag, Shug Drag, Zhugdra, and Shuel Drak. Shugdrak is divided into three parts namely Drakar Namkha Dzong at the upper end, Duedul Singye Dzong in the middle, and Chungchen khading Dzong at the foothills.

The Shugdra Lhakhang was built by Garpa Nado in 1944.The main statue of the Goenpa is Padmasambhava discovered by Garpa Nado. The pilgrimage around Shuk Drak will take one whole day to complete visiting all the sacred sites.

== Festival ==
Every year, on the 4th day of the 6th month, which corresponds to the First Sermon of Lord Buddha, Choetshog is performed, while the Zhithro ritual is conducted on the 11th day of the 6th month, which corresponds to the winter solstice.

== See also ==
- Choedrak Monastery
- Kunzangdrak Monastery
- Thowadrak Monastery
