= Lingzhi Gewog =

Lingzhi Gewog གླིང་གཞི་
- Gewog
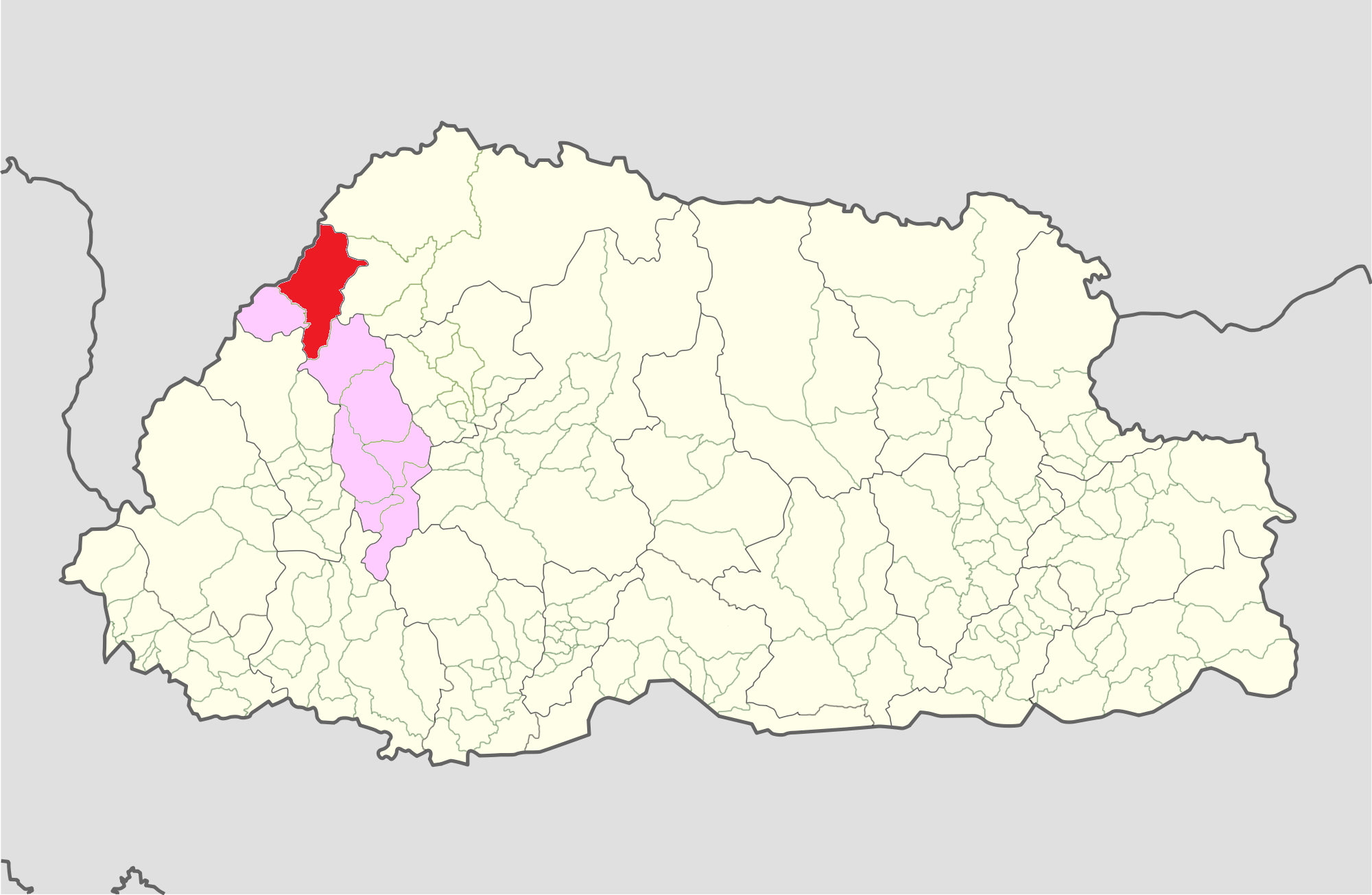
- Country: Bhutan
- District: Thimphu
- Sub-district: Lingzhi

Area
  - Total: 386.8 km^{2} (149.3 sq mi)

Population (2017)
  - Total: 490
  - Density: 1.3/km^{2} (3.3/sq mi)
- Time zone: UTC+6 (BTT)

Lingzhi Gewog (Dzongkha: གླིང་གཞི་) is a gewog in Thimphu District, Bhutan. It forms part of the Lingzhi sub-district (dungkhag), which also includes the gewogs of Naro and Soe. Spread over an area of 386.8 km^{2} (149.3 sq mi), it had a population of 490 in 2017.

== Geography ==
Lingzhi is one of the eight gewogs in Thimphu District (dzongkhag). It is part of the Lingzhi sub-district (dungkhag), which also includes the gewogs of Naro and Soe. It is spread over an area of 386.8 km^{2} (149.3 sq mi), and comprises five chiwogs. It is bordered by Soe gewog to the southwest and Naro gewog to the south. Snowcaps and glaciers occupy about 11% of the land area of the gewog, grasslands and pastures cover 39% of the land area, and the remaining area consists of rocky outcrops and eroded lands. The western branch of the Mo Chhu is fed by the Lingzhi Chhu.

== Lingzhi Yugyal Dzong ==
The Lingzhi Yugyal Dzong, located in the gewog, serves as a administrative and religious center. It was originally constructed in 1668 by Chogyal Minjur Tempa, the third Druk Desi, to commemorate Bhutan's victory over Tibet in the war of 1667. Situated at an altitude of 4,150 m (13,620 ft), it is located at a strategic location along the Tibetan border. It was destroyed by an earthquake in 1897, and was rebuilt in the 1950s, with further renovations in 2005. After an earthquake caused damage to the fortress in 2011, it was restored between 2018 and 2024 with fuding from the Government of India.

== Demographics and economy ==
As of 2017, Lingzhi gewog had a population of 490 inhabitants including 276 males and 214 females. About 23.7% of the population was below the age of six years and the entire population was classified as rural.

The local population is involved in yak rearing and often engage in barter trade of livestock produce with the neighboring gewogs such as Laya and Lunana. A 2004 study found that the average yak size in Lingzhi was larger than those from the neighboring gewogs due to different feeding practices.
