= Thowadra Monastery =

Monastery in Bumthang, Bhutan

Thowadrak Monastery
- Location within Bhutan

Religion
- Affiliation: Tibetan Buddhism

Location
- Location: Bumthang District
- Country: Bhutan
- Coordinates: 27.6753°N 90.9123°E

Architecture
- Founder: Lorepa
- Established: 1238; 788 years ago

Thowadra Monastery is a cliffside Buddhist monastery in the Tang Valley of Bumthang District, Bhutan. Thowadra means "high rock", given its location and altitude of 3,400 metres (11,200 ft).

Thowadrak is 47 kilometers from Chamkhar Town and it is a 3-hour hike from the nearest farm road point. It is one of the four sacred cliffs of Guru Rinpoche in Bumthang. The other three are Choedrak, Kunzangdrak and Shukdrak. Thowadra Lhakhang, also called Tha Dra, is regarded as one of the "gates" leading to the secret valley of Khenpajong.

== History ==
The site was blessed by Padmasambhava, who came here to meditate during the 8th century. He is said to have left behind a wooden bird which he used to expel an evil king from the beyul "hidden land" of Khenpajong. The monastery itself was founded in 1238 by Lorepa (1187-1250), the lama of the Drukpa Lineage of the Kagyu school who established Choedrak Monastery.

The site was originally a hermitage, once sanctified by the presence of both Longchenpa and Dorje Lingpa. A Nyingma community was established later in the 18th century by Changchub Gyeltsen (Jigme Kundrel), a disciple of Dzogchen master Jigme Lingpa (1730-1798). A noted nun plagued with leprosy, Gelongma Pelmo, also meditated here.

Since the 18th century it has been occupied by followers of Jigme Lingpa, who was one of the most important tertöns of Tibet, and Jigme Kundrol of the Longchen Nyingthig tradition. Thowadra marks the entrance to Khenpajong east of Lhedam in north Bumthang and Lhuntse Districts.

== See also ==
- Choedrak Monastery
- Kunzangdrak Monastery
- Shuk Drak Goenpa

== Footnotes ==
- Pommaret, Françoise (2009). Bhutan : Himalayan mountain kingdom. Internet Archive. Hong Kong : Odyssey ; New York : [Distributed by] W.W. Norton. ISBN 978-962-217-810-6.
- Dorje, Gyurme (1999). Tibet Handbook: With Bhutan. Footprint Handbooks. ISBN 978-1-900949-33-0.
