= Bumpailog =

Village in Wangdue Phodrang, Bhutan

Bumilog བུ་མི་ལོག Bumpailog
- Village
- Location in Bhutan
- Coordinates: 27°31′00″N 90°15′42″E
- Country: Bhutan
- District: Wangdue Phodrang District
- Village block: Sephu Gewog

Population (2026)
  - Total: 197
- Time zone: UTC+6 (BTT)

Bumpailog, also spelled Bumilog (Dzongkha: བུ་མི་ལོག) is a village in Wangdue Phodrang, Bhutan. It is located on the Wangdue Phodrang-Trongsa Highway, overlooking Rukubji village. These two villages fall under one divided chiwog, a Bhutanese administrative division. Bumpailog is about 70 km from Wangdue Phodrang and 50 km from Trongsa. The residents of Bumpailog make a living through agriculture and animal husbandry; vegetable farming and the products of domestic animals compose most of their income.

The Bumpailog Lhakhang is the public temple of the Bumpailog community.
