= Lunana dialect =

Language spoken in Bhutan

Lunana
- ལུང་ནག་ན་ཁ་
- Native to: Bhutan
- Region: Lunana Gewog, Gasa District
- Native speakers: (700 cited 1998)
- Language family: Sino-Tibetan: Tibeto-Burman; Tibeto-Kanauri (?); Bodish; Tibetic; Dzongkha–Lhokä; Dzongkha; Lunana
- Writing system: Tibetan

Language codes
- ISO 639-3: luk
- Glottolog: luna1243

The Lunana language, Lunanakha (Dzongkha: ལུང་ནག་ན་ཁ་; Wylie: lung-nag-na-kha) is a Tibetic language spoken in Bhutan (Lunana Gewog, Gasa District) by some 700 people in 1998. Most are yak-herding pastoralists. Lunana is a variety of Dzongkha, the national language of Bhutan.

== See also ==
- Lunana Gewog
- Lunana village
- Languages of Bhutan
