= Rukubji =

Ancient village in Bhutan

Coordinates: 27°31′N 90°16′E

Rukubji is an ancient village located in Sephu Gewog (Dzongkha: སྲས་ཕུག་) in Wangdue Phodrang District, in Bhutan.

== Geography ==
Rukubji sits on a ridge between three rivers on the edge of the Black Mountains. Some of the homes are more than 200 years old, with eroded mud and bamboo walls.
Rukubji village is located in Sephu Gewog. Sephu Gewog is located in the northeastern part of Wangdue Phodrang Dzongkhag and is the largest gewog (area-wise). Sephu is made up of 10 villages (Buso, Zerey. Dubzor, Nangkha, Rukubji, Bumpailog, Rewana, Longtey, Gangchukha and Thaney) and consists of 276 number of households. Sephu consists of an estimated area of 1105.70 km^{2}. The terrain is mostly rugged, with an altitude of 2800 to 5000 meters above sea level. Settlements are scattered and mostly migratory in nature. There are 2 Community Primary Schools (Rukubji Primary School and Sephu Primary School), 1 AEC, 1 LEC, 1 post office agent, 1 GR II BHU in Chazam, 1 logging unit, 1 monastic education center, several lhakhangs of which Wangdue Gompa, Rukubji Lhakhang, and Bumpailog Lhakhang are the most important Lhakhang in the gewog. Effectively, all villages have a community lhakhang. All the administrative offices of the local government are located in Chazam.

== History and Mythology ==
The ridge on which the village is built is said to resemble a snake, a harmful spirit, which in the area's ancient history and mythology was subdued by the founder of Bhutanese Buddhism, Guru Rinpoche. This and three nearby villages totaling 90 households are known today as being part of another successful micro-hydro installation.
