= Soe Gewog =

Soe Gewog སྲོས་
- Gewog
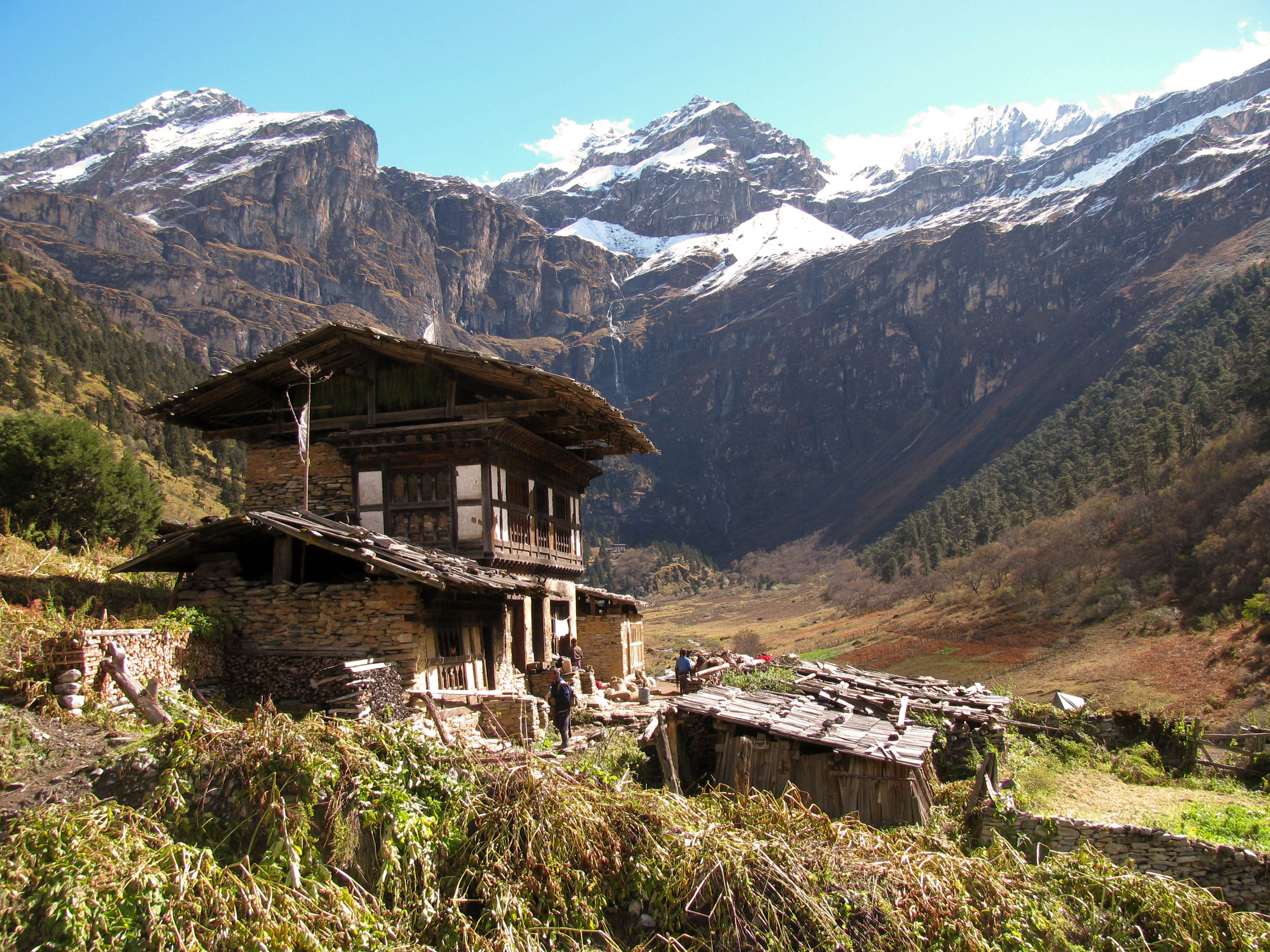
- Farmhouse, Soe Gewog

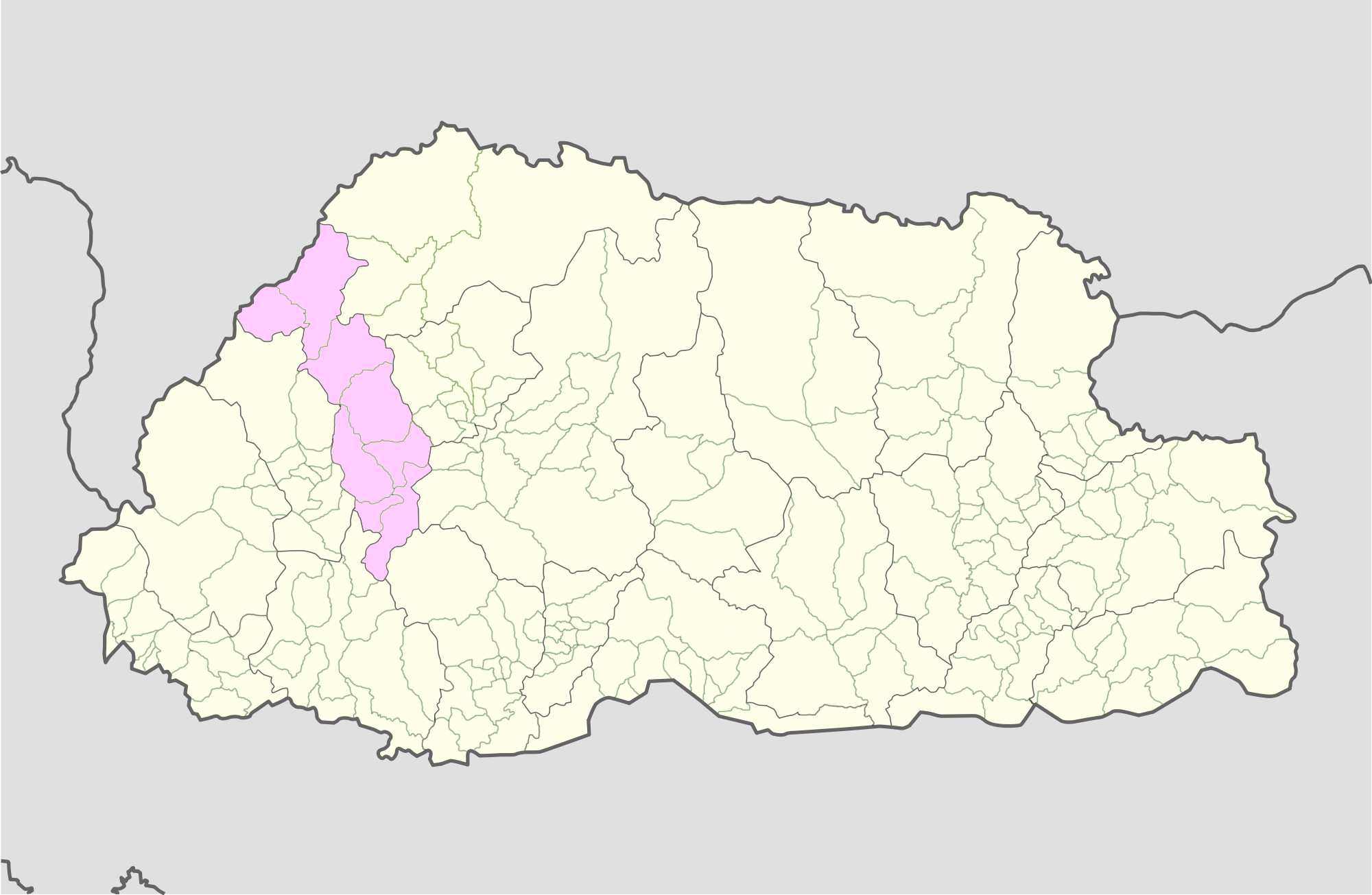
- Country: Bhutan
- District: Thimphu District
- Time zone: UTC+6 (BTT)

Soe Gewog (Dzongkha: སྲོས་) is a gewog (village block) of Thimphu District, Bhutan. Soe Gewog, along with Naro and Lingzhi Gewogs, is part of Lingzhi Dungkhag.
