= Buli Tsho =

Pilgrimage place and Lake in Bhutan

- བུ་ལི་མཚོ (Dzongkha)
- Location within Bhutan
- Location: Zhemgang District, Bhutan
- Coordinates: 27°09′14.3″N 90°48′33.4″E
- Surface area: 2 hectares (4.9 acres)
- Surface elevation: 1,372 metres (4,501 ft)

Buli Tsho is a natural lake and pilgrimage place located in the heart of a thick forest at a place called Baer-pang in Zhemgang District of Bhutan.

== Area ==
The surface area of the Buli Tsho is 2 ha and situated at an altitude of 1372 m from sea level.

== Cultural significance ==
Tshomen Kuntu Zangmo commonly known as Buli Menmo is believed to be the deity of the Buli Tsho Lake; believed to be half lady and lower half snake.
