= Naro Gewog =

Naro Gewog ན་རོ་
- Gewogs
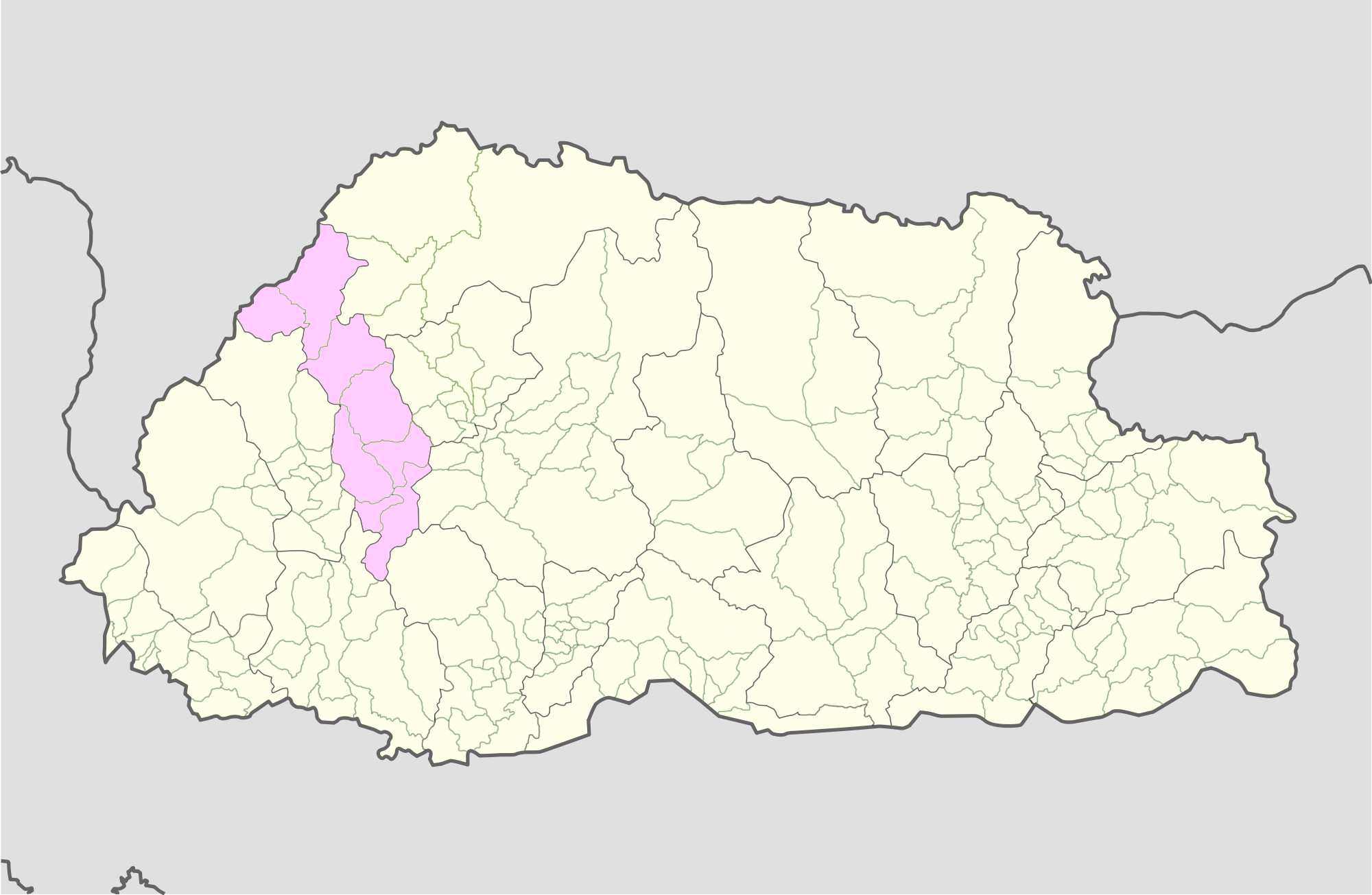
- Country: Bhutan
- District: Thimphu District
- Time zone: UTC+6 (BTT)

Naro Gewog (Dzongkha: ན་རོ་) is a gewog (village block) of Thimphu District, Bhutan. Naro Gewog, along with Lingzhi and Soe Gewogs, is part of Lingzhi Dungkhag.
