= Sephu Gewog =

Settlement in Bhutan

Coordinates: 27°31′4″N 90°17′48″E

Sephu Gewog སྲས་ཕུག་
- Gewog
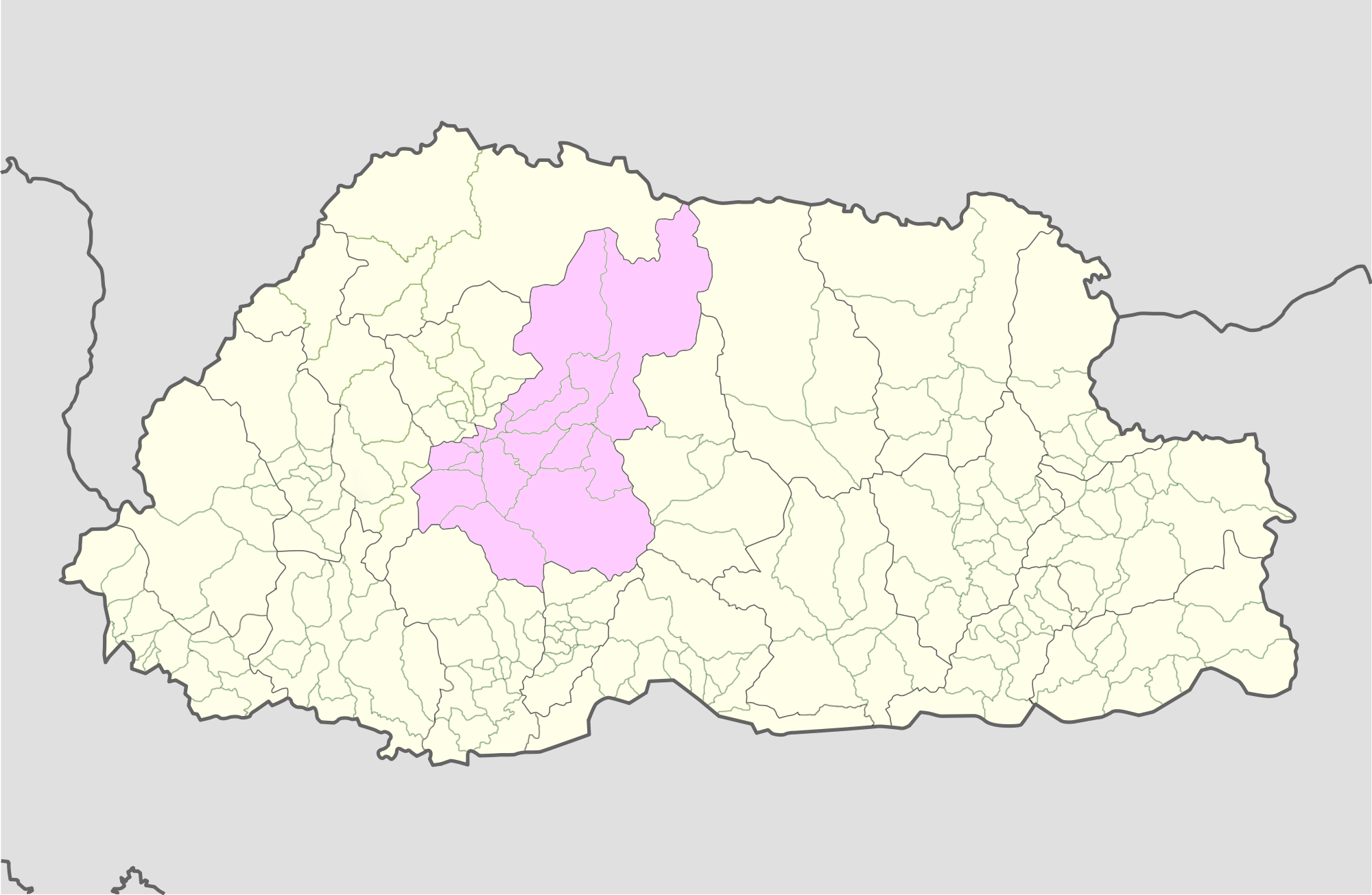
- Country: Bhutan
- District: Wangdue Phodrang District
- Time zone: UTC+6 (BTT)

Sephu Gewog (Dzongkha: སྲས་ཕུག་, also transliterated as Saephoog Gewog is a gewog (village block) of Wangdue Phodrang District, Bhutan.

At an altitude ranging from 2600 to 3500 meters above sea level, Saephoog gewog is situated en route to Trongsa, located north eastern part of Wangduephodrang dzongkhag. One can reach Saephoog gewog centre after three hours’ drive from Wangdue dzongkhag by passing the rough highway road, made due to the stone quarry and road widening along the highway. The gewog comprises five chiwogs (Buso-Zeri, Rukubjee - Bumpailog, Longtoed, Bumilog and Nakha) with a total of 331 households, and a population of 1505 people. Saephoog consists of an estimated area of 110801.221758 ha, the largest among the other gewogs under Wangdue. The chiwogs are scattered away from each other but the households under individual chiwogs are nucleated.

Saephoog Gewog enjoys a temperate climate with mostly rugged terrain and snow fall during winter. The Gewog has high potential for livestock and has established one milk processing unit one at Rukubjee. Potato cultivation dominates among the agriculture farming activities and most of the production were sold to Punatshangchu project through farmers group.

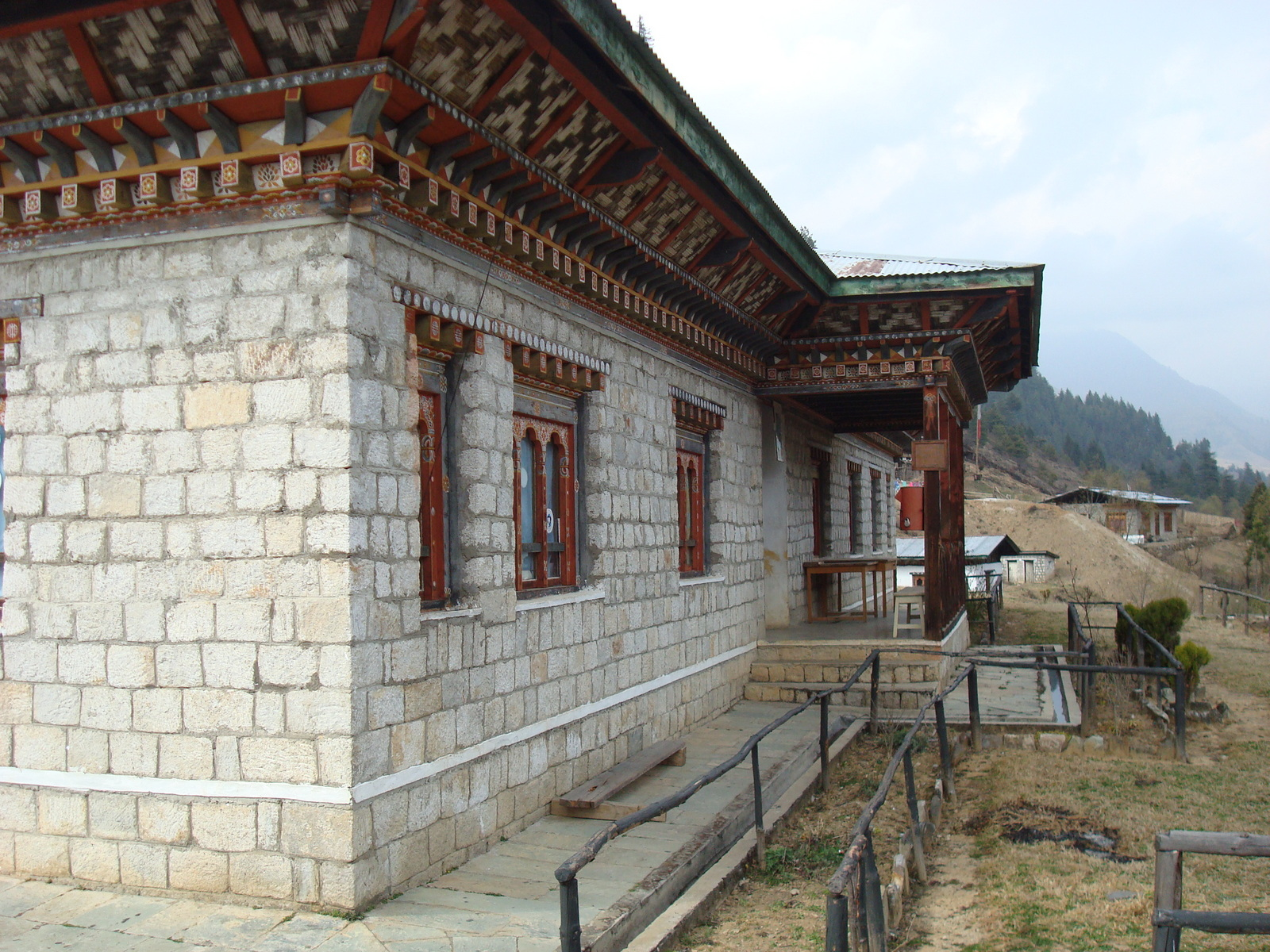
Sephu Basic Health Unit (BHU) and Community Mail Office (CMO)

During the cordyceps season (June) the villagers used to migrate to the highlands for cordyceps collection leaving behind those who can't afford to walk. The Gewog Administration used to issue three permits per household for the duration of one month. It is one of the main sources of income for Saephoog farmers.

Most of the villages under Saephoog enjoy the basic needs like electricity, rural water supply scheme, farm roads and telecommunication. Total the gewog has connected approximately 45.52 km of farm roads to villages as of now, which made it easier for farmers to transport their products to the nearest market.

Government infrastructure such as schools, RNR and a Basic health unit was also established for service delivery. A Community Centre with facilities such as photocopy, half photo and internet was operational in the year 2013 with one operator, and benefits the farmers in terms of time consumption and transportation expenses.

Out of 7 communities and 2 privately owned lhakhang, The WangdueGoenpa lhakhang has a monastic education centre at present.
