= Jigme Dorji National Park =

National Park of Bhutan

Coordinates: 27°45′N 89°31′E

- IUCN category II (national park)
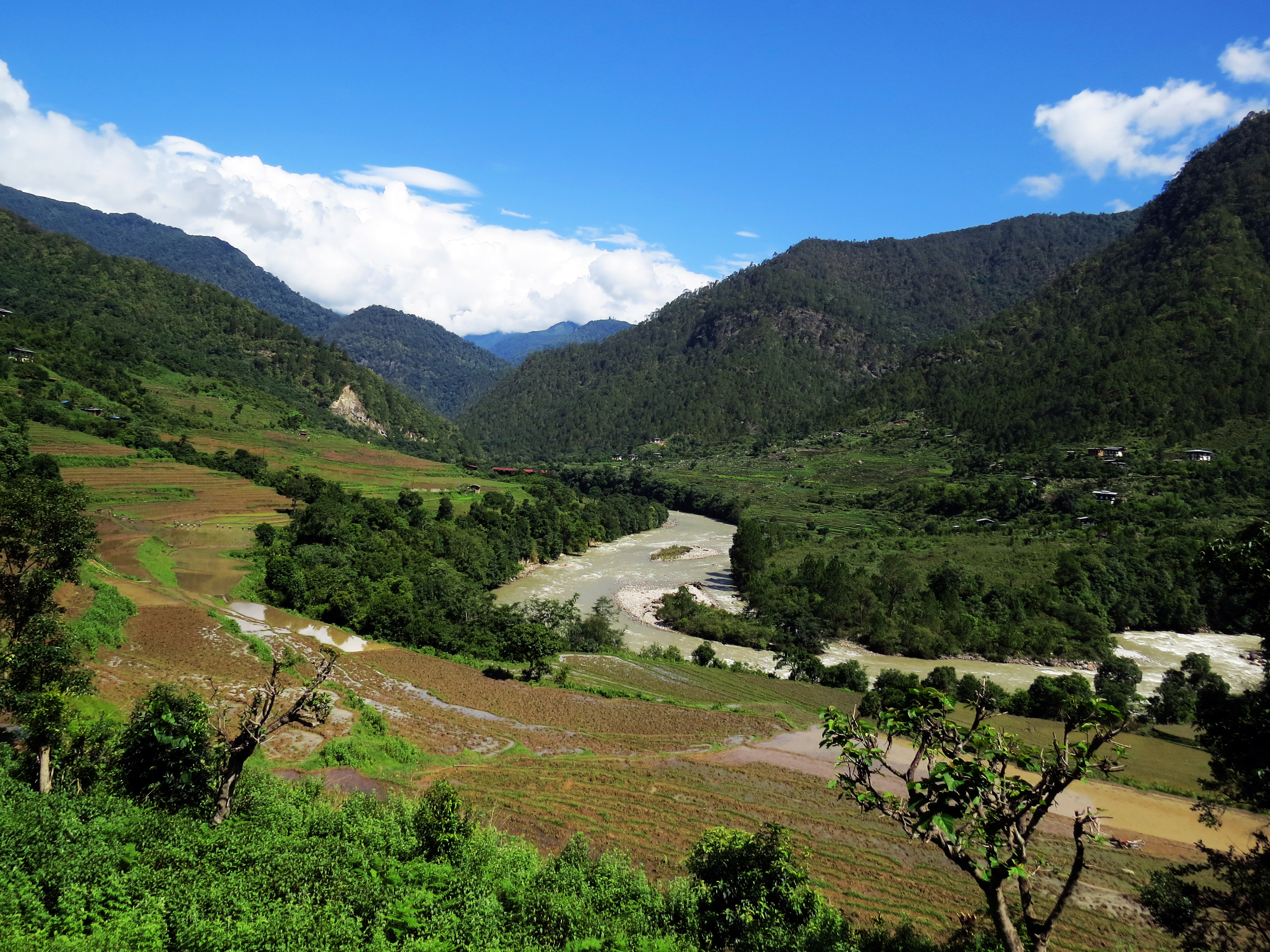

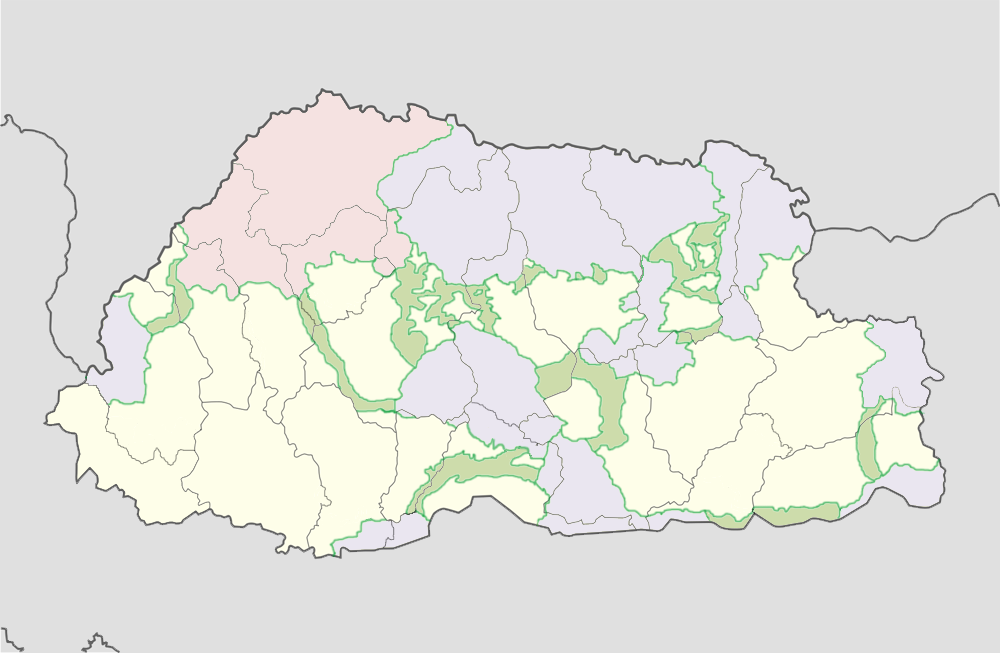
- Location of Jigme Dorji National Park in pink
- Location: Gasa, Paro, Punakha, Thimphu, Wangdue Phodrang, Bhutan
- Area: 4,316 km^{2} (1,666 sq mi)
- Named for: Jigme Dorji Wangchuck
- Website: Bhutan Trust Fund for Environmental Conservation

Jigme Dorji National Park (JDNP), named after the late Jigme Dorji Wangchuck, is the second-largest National Park of Bhutan.

== History ==
It was established in 1974 and stretches over an area of 4316 km^{2}, thereby spanning all three climate zones of Bhutan, ranging in elevation from 1400 to over 7000 meters. About 6,500 people in 1,000 households live within the park, from subsistence agriculture and animal husbandry. It is listed as a tentative site in Bhutan's Tentative List for UNESCO inclusion.

== Location ==
It occupies almost the entire Gasa District, as well as the northern areas of Thimphu District, Paro District, Punakha, and Wangdue Phodrang Districts.

== Flora and fauna ==
The park provides sanctuary for 37 known species of mammals including several endangered, threatened or vulnerable species, such as the Bhutan takin, snow leopard, clouded leopard, Bengal tiger, bharal or Himalayan blue sheep, black musk deer, Himalayan black bear, red panda, Ussuri dhole, and spotted linsang. It is also home to the Indian leopard, Himalayan serow, sambar, barking deer, Himalayan goral, Himalayan marmot, Himalayan pika, and more than 300 species of birds. It is also the only park in Bhutan where the national animal (takin), flower (blue poppy), bird (raven) and tree (cypress) exist together.

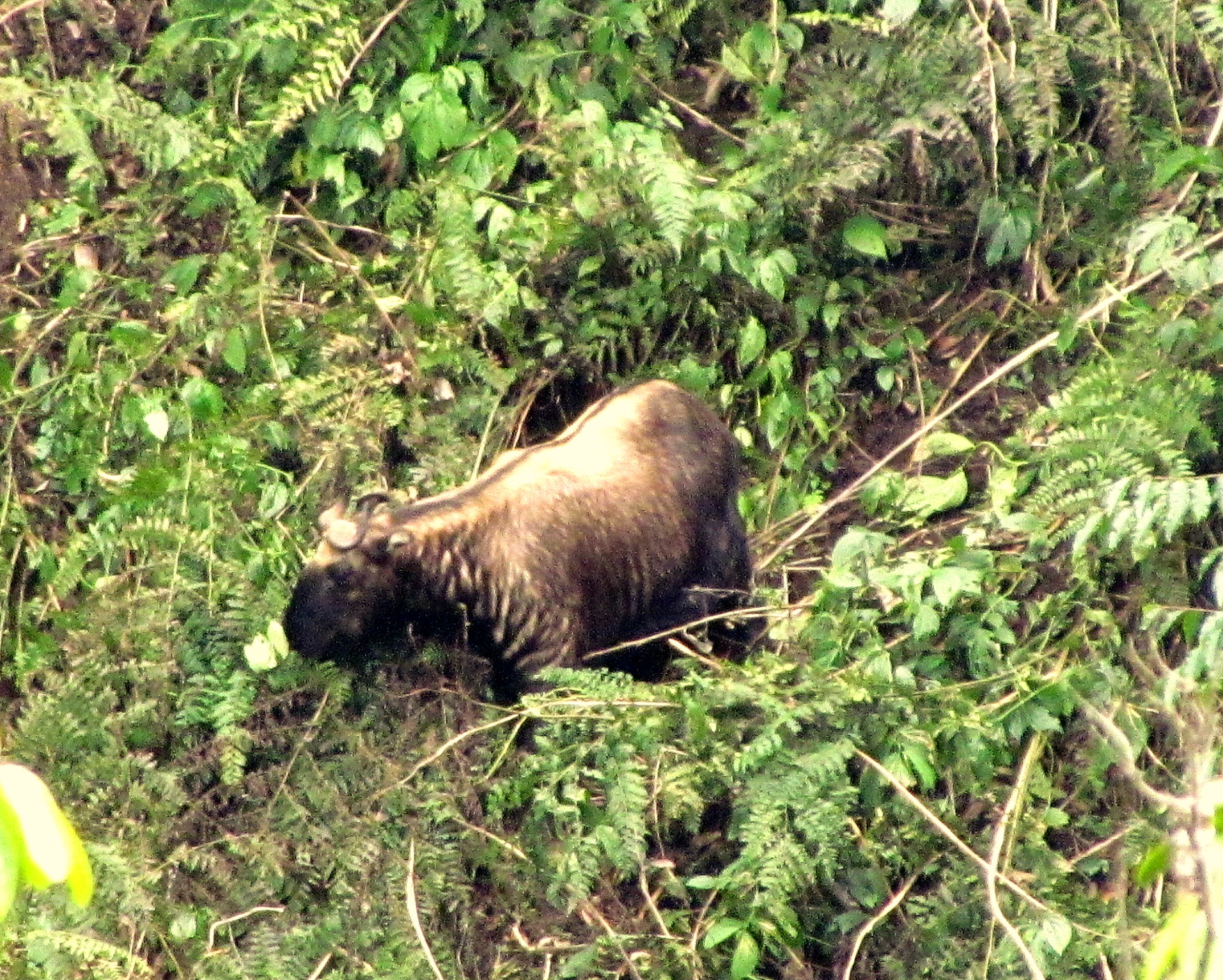
Bhutan Takin

== Cultural sites ==
Jigme Dorji also contains sites of cultural and economic significance. Mount Jomolhari and Mount Jitchu Drake are worshipped as homes of the local deity. The fortresses of Lingshi Dzong and Gasa Dzong are sites of historical importance. The rivers Mo Chhu, Wangdi Chhu and Pa Chhu (Paro Chhu) have their sources in the glacial lakes located in the park.

== Glaciers ==
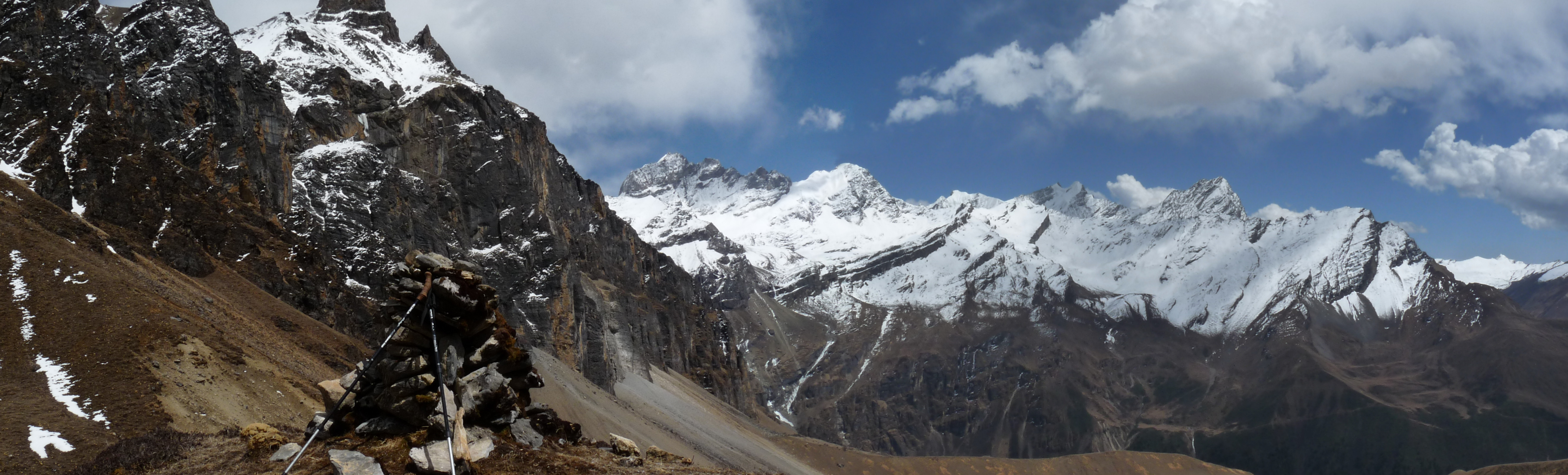
Peaks of the Himalayas in the National Park

Jigme Dorji National Park covers most of northern Gasa District, including the bulk of Lunana and Laya Gewogs. These gewogs are the site of some of the most notable and precarious glaciers of Bhutan. These glaciers have thawed significantly over the course of recorded history, causing lethal and destructive glacial lake outburst floods. Chief among the glaciers and glacial lakes within the park are Thorthormi, Luggye, and Teri Kang. As the seasons allow, temporary camps of laborers work within the park to reduce water levels to assuage the threat of flooding downstream.

== See also ==
- List of protected areas of Bhutan
- Glaciers of Bhutan
