= Jimilang Tsho =

Lake in Bhutan

- Sand Ox Lake
- བྱེམ་མའི་གླང་མཚོ། (Dzongkha)
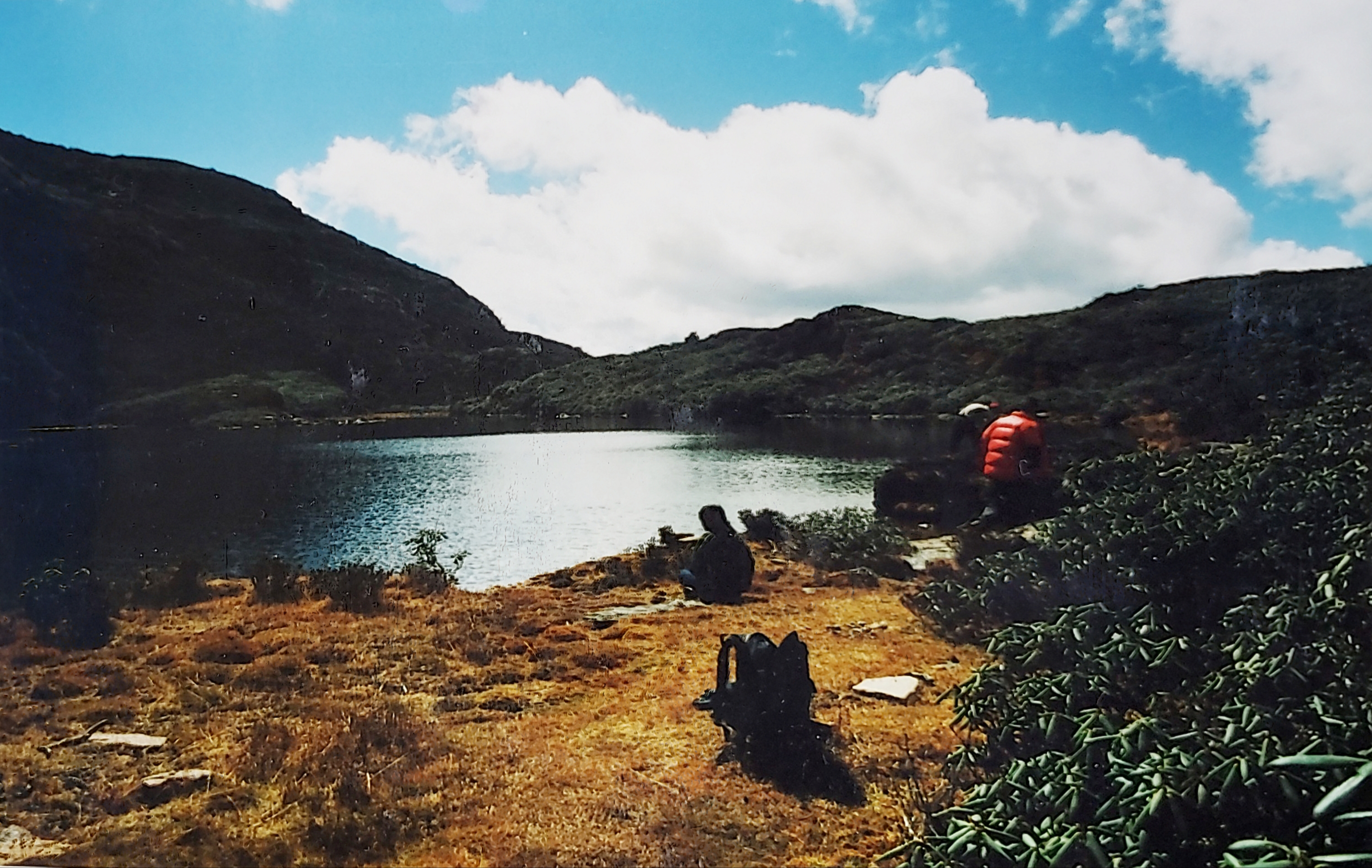
- Fishing at Jimilang Tsho

- Location within Bhutan
- Location: Thimphu District, Bhutan
- Coordinates: 27°32′49.7″N 89°30′20.8″E
- Surface elevation: 3,870 metres (12,700 ft)

Jimilang Tsho (also known as Sand Ox Lake) is a natural lake in Thimphu District of Bhutan.

== Geography ==
This lake is situated at an altitude of 3870 m from sea level.

== Etymology ==
Jimilang Tsho (Sand Ox Lake) takes its name from a legend about a bull that rose out of the lake and joined the cows of a family utilizing the territory as a summer grazing ground.

== Aquafauna ==
Jimilang Tsho is additionally known for its giant trouts, which were introduced during the 1970s.
