= Gasa District =

District of Bhutan

Gasa District དགའ་ས་རྫོང་ཁག།
- District
- Gasa District
- Seal

- Location of Gasa district within Bhutan
- Country: Bhutan
- Capital: Gasa Dzong

Area
  - Total: 3,117.74 km^{2} (1,203.77 sq mi)
- Highest elevation: 4,500 m (14,800 ft)
- Lowest elevation: 1,500 m (4,900 ft)

Population (2005)
  - Total: 3,116
  - Estimate (2010): 3,396
  - Rank: 20th
  - Density: 0.9994/km^{2} (2.589/sq mi)
- Time zone: UTC+6 (BTT)
  - Summer (DST): UTC+6 (not observed)
- HDI (2019): 0.536 low · 20th of 20
- Website: www.gasa.gov.bt

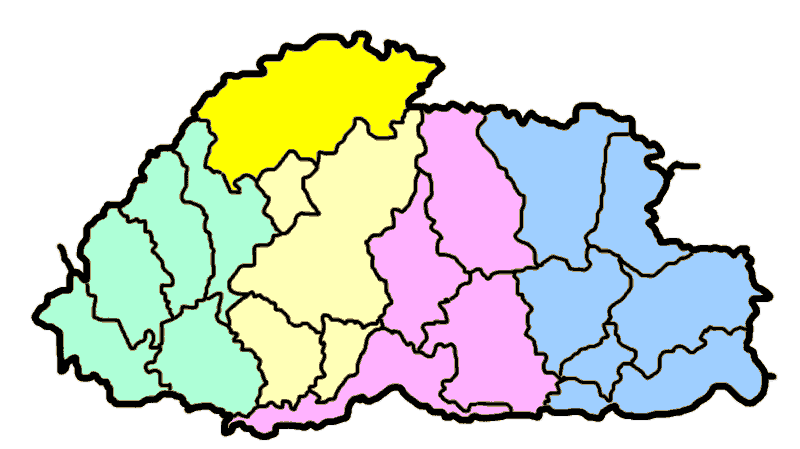
Map of Bhutan showing former borders of Gasa

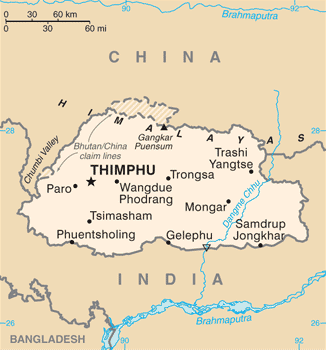
Map of Bhutan showing borders as of 2010

Gasa District (Dzongkha: དགའ་ས་རྫོང་ཁག།; Wylie: dgav-sa rdzong-khag, also མགར་ས་རྫོང་ཁག།) is one of the 20 dzongkhags (districts) comprising Bhutan. The capital of Gasa District is Gasa Dzong near Gasa. It is located in the far north of the county and spans the Middle and High regions of the Tibetan Himalayas. The dominant language of the district is Dzongkha, which is the national language. Related languages, Layakha and Lunanakha, are spoken by semi-nomadic communities in the north of the district. The People's Republic of China claims the northern part of Gasa District.

Gasa has an area of 3,117.74 km^{2} (1,203.77 sq mi) as of 2010, formerly 4,409.30 km^{2} (1,702.44 sq mi) as of 2002. It had a population of 3,116 as of the 2005 census, making it the largest, least populated, and thus least densely populated of all the dzongkhags; it is also the least developed district of Bhutan.

== History ==
Gasa was formerly a drungkhag (sub-district) of the Punakha dzongkhag (district). It became a separate dzongkhag in 1992, the start of 7th Five Year Plan.

== Administrative divisions ==
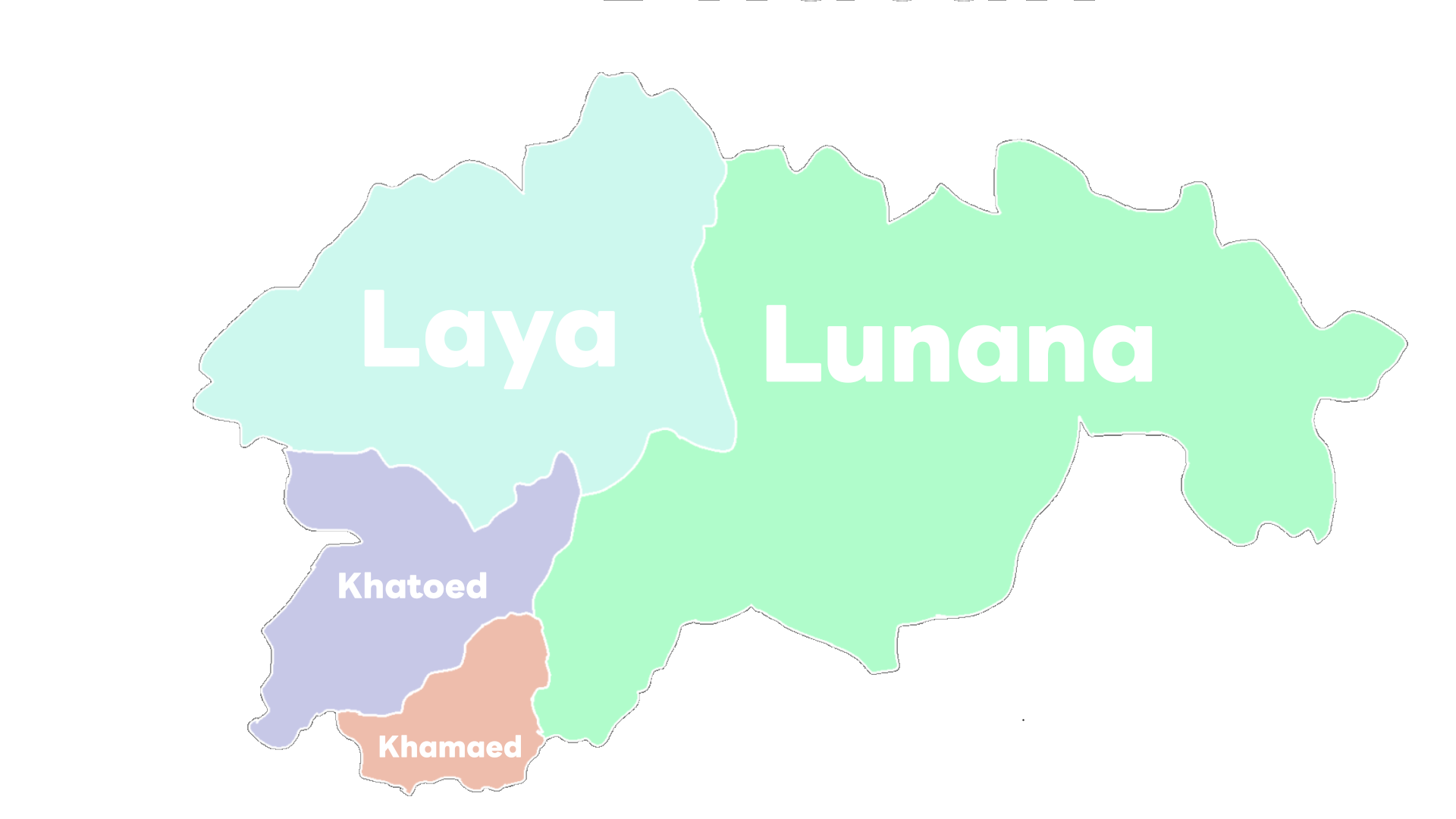

Gasa District is divided into four village blocks (or gewogs):

- Khamaed Gewog, (formerly known as Goenkhamae)
- Khatoed Gewog (formerly known as Goenkaatoe)
- Laya Gewog
- Lunana Gewog

== Geography ==
Gasa is bordered to the north by Tibet Autonomous Region of the People's Republic of China and by Thimphu, Punakha, and Wangdue Phodrang district to the south.

== Economy ==
Gasa has become a tourist destination because of its pristine forests and the exceptionally scenic location of its Dzong. In 2008 a massive flood on the Mo Chhu (Female River) destroyed a popular hot spring complex, which is under restoration and was to re-open in late 2011. The high altitude makes farming difficult, although government programs seek to establish mustard and summer vegetable planting programs. Residents herd yaks and dzos, and a small number benefit from the nascent tourism industry. A narrow road from Punakha, which is mostly unpaved, reaches up to the Dzong and is now being extended up to Laya. The majority of the known herds of wild Takin occur in Gasa. Electricity is also being supplied to some of the gewogs and all electrification programs are expected to be completed by 2012.

Gasa is most famous for its Layap people and the Snowman Trek, one of the most challenging treks in the Himalayas.

== Environment ==
All of Gasa is an environmentally protected area of Bhutan. Most parts of the dzongkhag lie within Jigme Dorji National Park (Khamaed, Khatoed, Laya, Lunana Gewogs), although the northeast reaches of Gasa are part of Wangchuck Centennial Park (Lunana Gewog). Several of Bhutan's glaciers are located in Gasa, namely in Lunana Gewog, which borders Tibet.

== Tourism ==
Gasa Tashi Thongmön Dzong

Also known as Gasa Dzong was built in the 17th century by Zhabdrung as a defensive fortress against northern attacks in 1646.

Sabhi Goenpa

Tshechu Drak

Tshechu Dra is a sacred cliff of longevity located in the Panikong village where Guru Rinpoche is said to have extracted longevity water from a cliff to benefit sentient beings.

Zabsel Drubdey Rawai Drubdey

Gasa Tshachu

Gasa Tshachu is a hot spring near the bank of the Mo Chhu River in Gasa at an elevation of 2100 meters, believed to cure 13 different types of diseases. It is one of the most popular hot springs in Bhutan.

Bjagay Menchu

== Festivals ==
- Annual Gasa Tshechu
- Royal Highland Festival
- Laya Run

== Climate ==
Climate data for Gasa, elevation 2,760 m (9,060 ft), (2003–2017 normals)
Month	Jan	Feb	Mar	Apr	May	Jun	Jul	Aug	Sep	Oct	Nov	Dec	Year
Record high °C (°F)	18.5 (65.3)	17.0 (62.6)	23.5 (74.3)	27.0 (80.6)	26.0 (78.8)	25.5 (77.9)	30.0 (86.0)	26.0 (78.8)	25.0 (77.0)	25.0 (77.0)	21.0 (69.8)	19.0 (66.2)	30.0 (86.0)
Mean daily maximum °C (°F)	9.9 (49.8)	10.3 (50.5)	13.3 (55.9)	15.7 (60.3)	17.7 (63.9)	19.6 (67.3)	21.0 (69.8)	20.7 (69.3)	19.9 (67.8)	17.8 (64.0)	13.2 (55.8)	11.4 (52.5)	15.9 (60.6)
Daily mean °C (°F)	4.4 (39.9)	4.9 (40.8)	7.0 (44.6)	11.0 (51.8)	12.9 (55.2)	15.2 (59.4)	16.5 (61.7)	16.4 (61.5)	15.7 (60.3)	13.3 (55.9)	7.8 (46.0)	5.8 (42.4)	10.9 (51.6)
Mean daily minimum °C (°F)	−1.1 (30.0)	−0.6 (30.9)	2.6 (36.7)	6.3 (43.3)	8.1 (46.6)	10.8 (51.4)	12.0 (53.6)	12.0 (53.6)	11.4 (52.5)	8.8 (47.8)	2.4 (36.3)	0.1 (32.2)	6.1 (42.9)
Record low °C (°F)	−7.0 (19.4)	−6.0 (21.2)	−5.0 (23.0)	−6.0 (21.2)	−6.0 (21.2)	2.0 (35.6)	4.0 (39.2)	3.0 (37.4)	6.0 (42.8)	−5.0 (23.0)	−6.0 (21.2)	−5.0 (23.0)	−7.0 (19.4)
Average rainfall mm (inches)	19.1 (0.75)	27.9 (1.10)	86.7 (3.41)	99.7 (3.93)	164.8 (6.49)	294.5 (11.59)	371.1 (14.61)	324.1 (12.76)	194.5 (7.66)	115.5 (4.55)	35.7 (1.41)	10.7 (0.42)	1,744.3 (68.68)
Average relative humidity (%)	71.7	71.3	74.0	73.3	75.3	83.7	85.2	83.5	81.2	73.3	73.5	71.5	76.5
Source: National Center for Hydrology and Meteorology

== See also ==
- Layap
- Districts of Bhutan
- Laya Gewog
- Lunana Gewog
