= Tang Valley =

- Location within Bhutan
- Coordinates: 27°45′8″N 90°40′40″E

Area
  - Total: 1,320 km^{2} (511 sq mi)
- Elevation: 2,800–5,000 m (9,200–16,400 ft)

Population
  - Total: 1,816
- Time zone: UTC+6 (Bhutan Time)

Tang Valley is one of the four valleys of Bumthang District, Bhutan.

It is located 11 km away from Jakar, the administrative center of Bumthang District, Bhutan. It trails higher up the lake called Mebartsho.

== Etymology ==
Guru Rinpoche in his attempt to subdue Khikha Rathoe, a son of Trisong Detsen, flew Khikha Rathoe and his ministers on a wooden aeroplane. As the aeroplane flew higher it caught fire and Guru Rimpoche landed it on a rock in a valley in Bumthang. It is believed that the valley was named after the sound the aeroplane made on landing: 'Tang'.

== Resource ==
- Lonely Planet, p.177
- TANG VALLEY
