= Gasa Dzong =

Fortress in Gasa, Bhutan

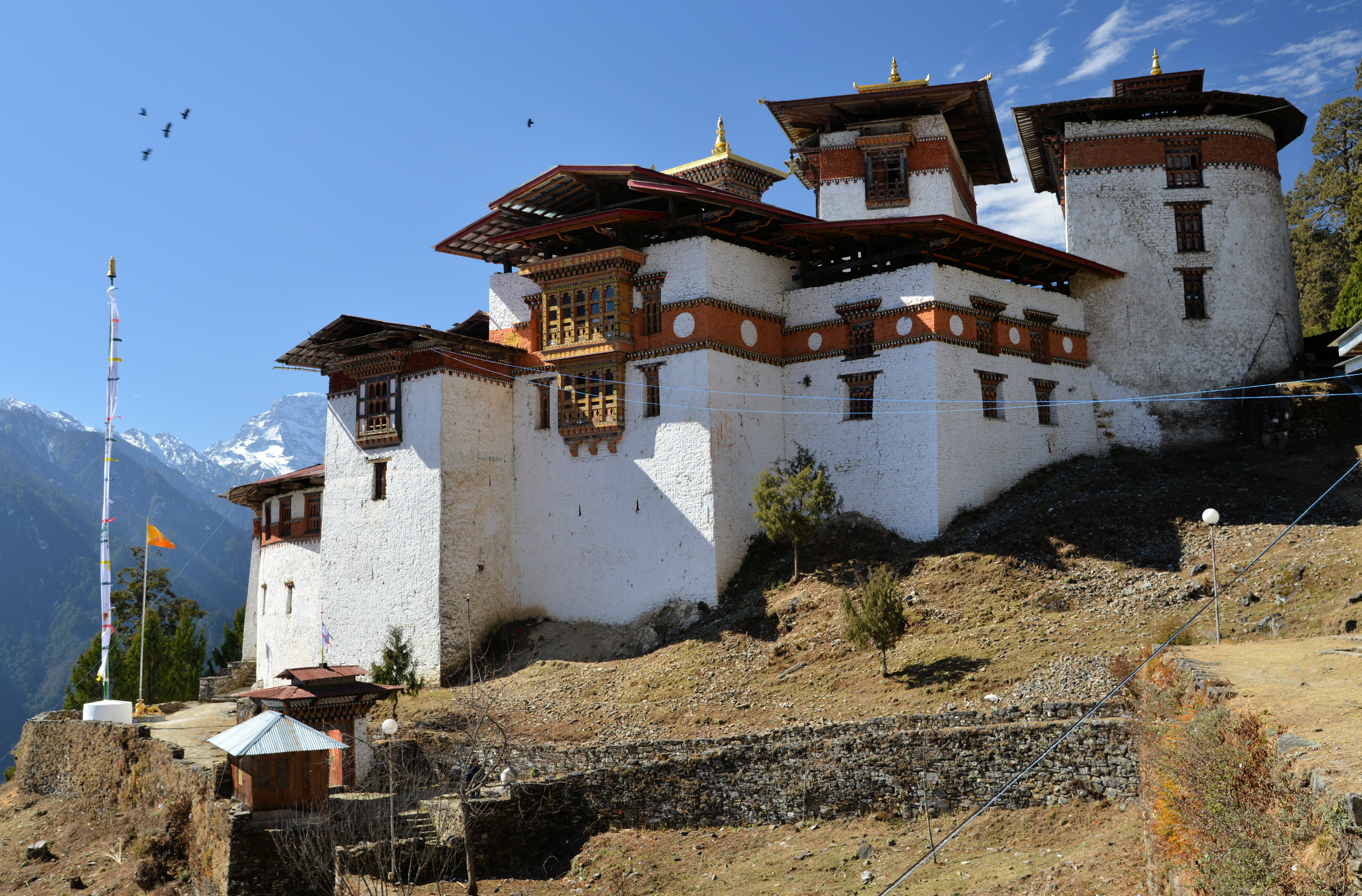
- Gasa Dzong

- Location within Bhutan

Religion
- Affiliation: Tibetan Buddhism
- Sect: Drukpa Lineage of Kagyu
- Festivals: Tsechu, in 2nd lunar month

Location
- Location: Gasa, Bhutan
- Interactive map of Gasa Dzong
- Coordinates: 27°54′14″N 89°42′40″E

Architecture
- Style: Bhutanese Dzong
- Founder: Tenzin Drukdra
- Established: 17th century
- Also known as Paro Dzong

Gasa Dzong (Dzongkha: དགའ་ས་རྫོང also མགར་ས་རྫོང) or Gasa Tashi Thongmön Dzong (མགར་ས་བཀྲིས་མཐོང་སྨོན་རྫོང་) near Gasa is the administrative center of Gasa Dzongkhag (district) in the northwestern region of Bhutan. The dzong was built in the 17th century by Tenzin Drukdra the second Druk Desi over the site of a meditation place established by Drubthob Terkungpa in the 13th century. The Dzong was constructed as a bulwark against attacks from the north and named Tashi Tongmön Dzong. It was later expanded by the fourth Desi, Gyalse Tenzin Rabgye. Inside the Guardian's Temple (Goenkhang) he placed ritual object and performed the consecration ceremony.

In January 2008 Gasa Dzong was badly damaged by a fire that took 10 hours to put out.

== History ==
Legend has it that when Zhabdrung was making his way to Bhutan, the deity of Gasa traveled to Tsari Kibuthang in Tibet to greet him. The Zhabdrung blessed the deity with the new name of ''Trashi Thongmoen''. Thus, the Dzong was also given the same name in 1648, since the deity was its protector.་ The locals say that the entire landscape has the appearance of the image of Tsheringma (ཚེ་རིང་མ།), Goddess of long life, and the dzong, named Trashi Thongmon, is built on the chest of the image, which happens to be the local deity of Gasa.

== Climate ==
Climate data for Gasa, elevation 2,760 m (9,060 ft), (2003–2017 normals)
Month	Jan	Feb	Mar	Apr	May	Jun	Jul	Aug	Sep	Oct	Nov	Dec	Year
Record high °C (°F)	18.5 (65.3)	17.0 (62.6)	23.5 (74.3)	27.0 (80.6)	26.0 (78.8)	25.5 (77.9)	30.0 (86.0)	26.0 (78.8)	25.0 (77.0)	25.0 (77.0)	21.0 (69.8)	19.0 (66.2)	30.0 (86.0)
Mean daily maximum °C (°F)	9.9 (49.8)	10.3 (50.5)	13.3 (55.9)	15.7 (60.3)	17.7 (63.9)	19.6 (67.3)	21.0 (69.8)	20.7 (69.3)	19.9 (67.8)	17.8 (64.0)	13.2 (55.8)	11.4 (52.5)	15.9 (60.6)
Daily mean °C (°F)	4.4 (39.9)	4.9 (40.8)	7.0 (44.6)	11.0 (51.8)	12.9 (55.2)	15.2 (59.4)	16.5 (61.7)	16.4 (61.5)	15.7 (60.3)	13.3 (55.9)	7.8 (46.0)	5.8 (42.4)	10.9 (51.6)
Mean daily minimum °C (°F)	−1.1 (30.0)	−0.6 (30.9)	2.6 (36.7)	6.3 (43.3)	8.1 (46.6)	10.8 (51.4)	12.0 (53.6)	12.0 (53.6)	11.4 (52.5)	8.8 (47.8)	2.4 (36.3)	0.1 (32.2)	6.1 (42.9)
Record low °C (°F)	−7.0 (19.4)	−6.0 (21.2)	−5.0 (23.0)	−6.0 (21.2)	−6.0 (21.2)	2.0 (35.6)	4.0 (39.2)	3.0 (37.4)	6.0 (42.8)	−5.0 (23.0)	−6.0 (21.2)	−5.0 (23.0)	−7.0 (19.4)
Average rainfall mm (inches)	19.1 (0.75)	27.9 (1.10)	86.7 (3.41)	99.7 (3.93)	164.8 (6.49)	294.5 (11.59)	371.1 (14.61)	324.1 (12.76)	194.5 (7.66)	115.5 (4.55)	35.7 (1.41)	10.7 (0.42)	1,744.3 (68.68)
Average relative humidity (%)	71.7	71.3	74.0	73.3	75.3	83.7	85.2	83.5	81.2	73.3	73.5	71.5	76.5
Source: National Center for Hydrology and Meteorology

== Sources ==
- Lopen Kunzang Thinley; Khenpo Rigzin Wangchuck; Karma Wangdi; Sonam Tenzin (2008). Seeds of Faith: a comprehensive guide to the sacred places of Bhutan. Vol. 1. Thimphu: KMT Press. pp. 298–301. ISBN 978-99936-22-42-0.
