= Lunana Gewog =

- Gewog
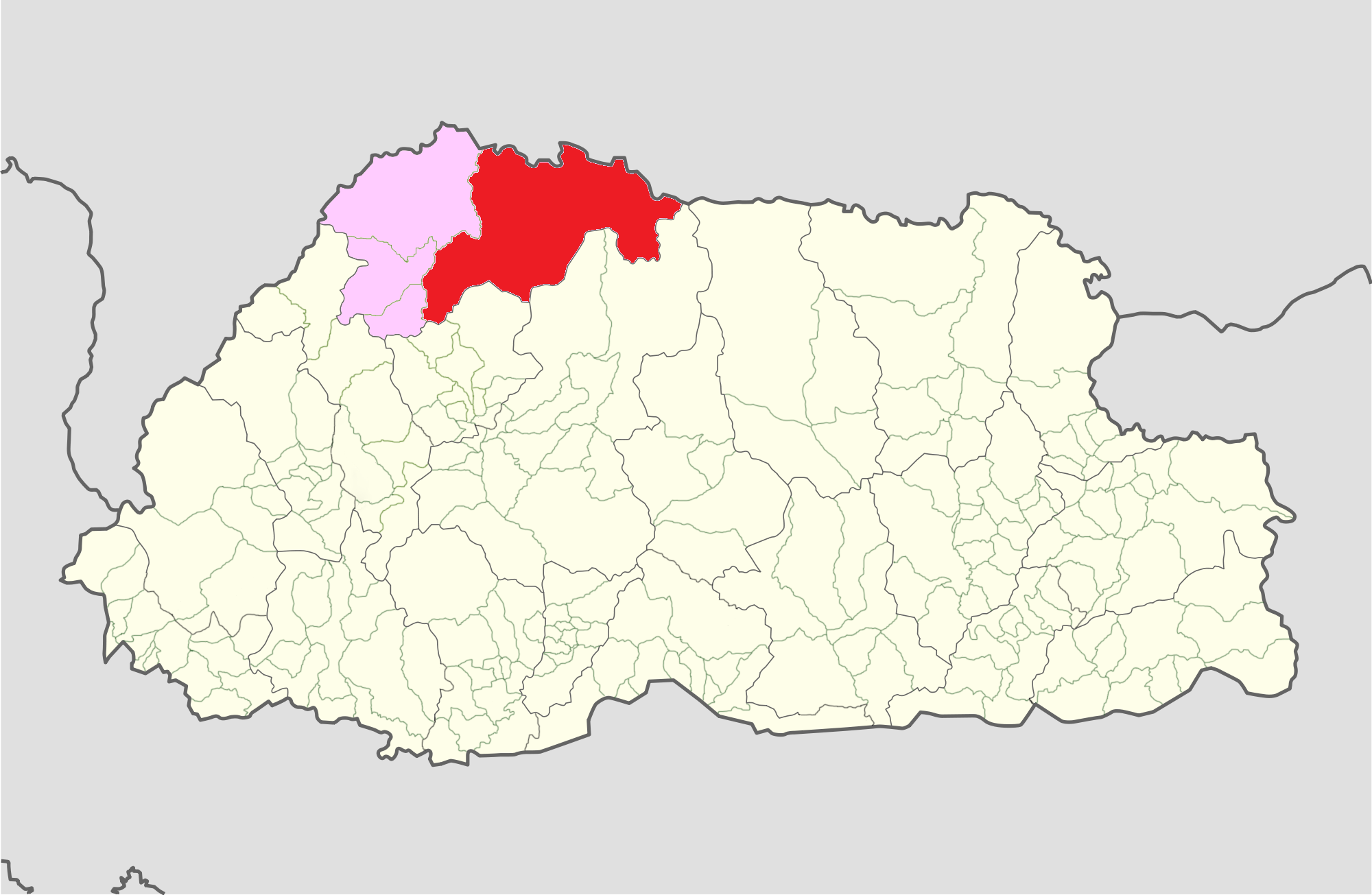
- Coordinates: 28°00′00″N 90°02′00″E
- Country: Bhutan
- District: Gasa District
- Seat: Lunana

Area
  - Total: 1,716.26 km^{2} (662.65 sq mi)
- Elevation: 3,400 m (11,200 ft)

Population (2014)
  - Total: 810
  - Density: 0.47/km^{2} (1.2/sq mi)
- Time zone: UTC+6 (BTT)

Lunana Gewog (Dzongkha: ལུང་ནག་ན་རྒེད་འོག) is a gewog in Gasa District, Bhutan. It is located in northwestern part of the country along the border with China. Spread over an area of 1,716.26 km^{2} (662.65 sq mi), it had a population of 810 in 2014.

== Geography ==
Lunana is one of the four gewogs in Gasa District. It is located at an altitude of 3,400 m (11,200 ft) in northwestern Bhutan. It is spread over an area of 1,716.26 km^{2} (662.65 sq mi), and comprises five chiwogs divided into 13 villages. It is bordered by the gewogs of Laya in the west, Goenshari in the southwest, Sephu in the southwest and shares an international border with the Tibet Autonomous Region of China in the north.

=== Hydrography ===
The headwaters of the Pho Chhu river is located in the hills of the gewog with several glaciers feeding the river. The Pho Chu basin consists of 154 glaciers covering 334.36 km^{2} (129.10 sq mi) with an estimated ice reserve of 32.27 km^{3} (7.74 cu mi). Climate change has increased the risk of glacial lake outburst floods in the Pho Chhu basin as increasing temperatures had accelerated glacier retreat and led to the expansion of glacial lakes. Lunana gewog has four glacial lakes of which three are amongst the 17 in the country identified as prone to outburst floods. Lunana gewog hosts some of the highest human settlements, and such floods pose a risk to settlements, agriculture, and other infrastructure. In 1994, a flood caused extensive damage in the gewog. Since 2008, the Government of Bhutan, with the aid of United Nations Development Programme, has implemented adaptation measures aidmed at reducing the risk of such floods in the Punakha and Wangdue valleys.

=== Climate ===
Due to its location at high altitude, the gewog experiences cool summers and harsh cold winters. Snowfall is common during winters, and often blocks movement through critical mountain passes that connect the neighbouring gewogs. The region receives an annual precipitation of 200 cm (79 in).

=== Flora and fauna ===
The gewog falls under the jurisdiction of Jigme Dorji and Wangchuck Centennial National Parks. These national parks support a wide range of fauna including musk deer, bharal, snow leopard, red panda, takin, Himalayan black bear, Bengal tiger, and several bird species. While snowcaps and glaciers occupy about 38% of the land area of the gewog, conifer forests and scrublands cover 27% of the land area, with the remaining land dominated by rocky outcrops and eroded lands.

== Demographics ==
As of 2014, Lunana gewog had a population of 810 including 384 males and 426 females. The population consists of 185 families dwelling in 13 villages that are spread across the gewog. The people in the region speak the Lunana dialect of Dzongkha.

== Economy ==
Due to the extreme climate conditions, limited agriculture is practiced. Major crops include wheat and vegetables like potato, radish, and turnip. Majority of the population are involved in livestock rearing and production of Yartsa gunbu. The people often engage in barter trade of livestock and produce with the neighbouring gewogs. Livestock rearers often migrate to lower altitude valleys during the winter. The closure of the Tibetan border following the Chinese invasion of Tibet in the late 1950s brought refugees from Tibet with their yaks, which they sold off at low prices. However, as there were no direct routes into Lunana from Tibet, Lunana did not benefit much from the same and most of the yaks brought into Lunana were from the neighbouring Laya and Sephu gewogs. Yak production increased in the 1980s and 1990s after the taxes were reduced and female yaks were distributed by the government in a bid to encourage livestock production.
