= Laya Gewog =

- Gewog
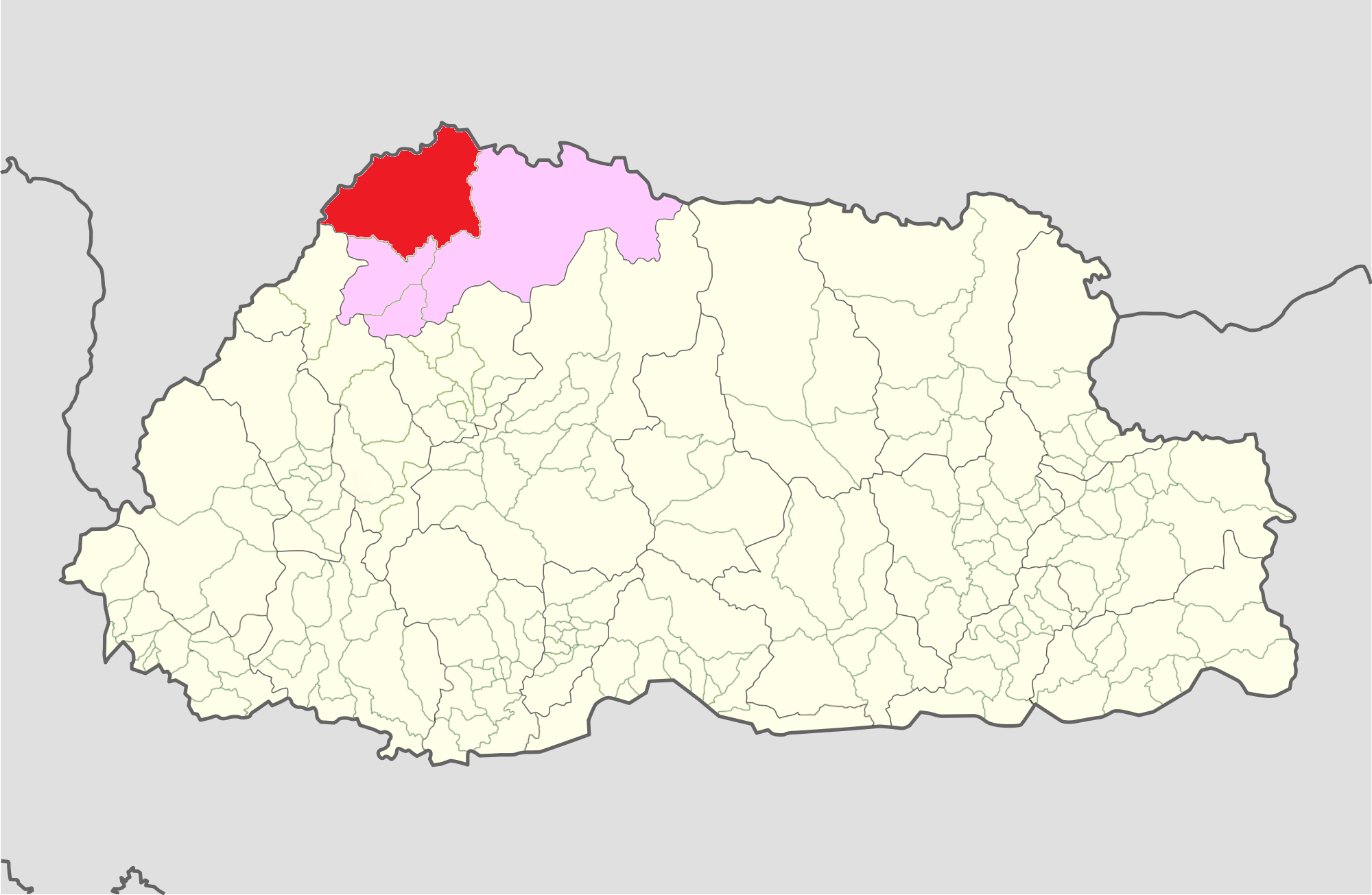
- Coordinates: 28°00′00″N 89°40′00″E
- Country: Bhutan
- District: Gasa District
- Seat: Laya

Area
  - Total: 981.5 km^{2} (379.0 sq mi)

Population (2005)
  - Total: 1,108
  - Density: 1.129/km^{2} (2.924/sq mi)
- Time zone: UTC+6 (BTT)

Laya Gewog (Dzongkha: ལུང་ནག་ན་རྒེད་འོག) is a gewog in Gasa District, Bhutan. It is located in northwestern part of the district along the border with China. Spread over an area of 981.5 km^{2} (379.0 sq mi), it had a population of 1,108 in 2005.

== Geography ==
Laya is one of the four gewogs in Gasa District (dzongkhag). Spread over an area of 981.5 km^{2} (379.0 sq mi), it is the second largest gewog by area in the district. It is bordered by Lunana Gewog in the east, and shares an international border with the Tibet Autonomous Region of China in the north. It is further divided into five chiwogs and seven villages.

=== Climate and vegetation ===
The gewong experiences cold winters and cool, wet summers with short autumn and spring seasons. The average temperatures vary between 16 °C (61 °F) in the hottest month of July to −8 °C (18 °F) in the coldest month of January. Average annual rainfall ranges from 40 to 60 cm (16 to 24 in). Snowfall is common during winters, and often blocks movement through critical mountain passes that connect the neighbouring gewogs. The headwaters of the Mo Chhu river is located in the hills of the gewog. The entire Gasa district falls under the jurisdiction of Jigme Dorji National Park. Snowcaps and glaciers occupy roughly about 30% of the land area of the gewog, conifer forests and scrublands cover 35% of the land area, with the remaining land dominated by rocky outcrops and pasture lands.

== Demographics ==
As of 2005, Laya gewog had a population of 1108 including 602 males and 506 females. The population is spread across 213 households in seven villages. The people in the region speak the Laya dialect of Dzongkha.

== Culture ==
The royal highland festival is celebrated annually on 16 October at Laya. The festival was first celebrated in 2016 to commemorate the birthday of prince Jigme Namgyel Wangchuck, 400 years since the founding of Bhutan by Ngawang Namgyal, and the rabjung (60 years cycle) of the birth year of Guru Rimpoche. During the festival, offering ('buelwa') is made, accompanied by traditional songs ('auley'), a practice which was established by Namgyal. Other activities include cultural and art programmes, competitions such as yak and horse races, and stalls that sell various local produce. The Laya Run is a 25 km (16 mi) run from Ponjothang to Taktsemakha, along the banks of Mo Chhu River, which marks the beginning of the festival.

== Economy ==
Due to the extreme climate conditions, majority of the population are involved in livestock rearing. The people often engage in barter trade of yaks and their produce with the neighbouring gewogs. The yak rearers often migrate to lower altitude valleys during the winter.

The closure of the Tibetan border following the Chinese invasion of Tibet in the late 1950s brought refugees from Tibet with their yaks, which they sold off at low prices. The closure of the border also meant that the local people were no longer compelled to work as porters for Tibetan and Bhutanese officials. Yak production further increased in the 1980s and 1990s after the taxes were reduced, and the practice of providing free yak service to nobles, or religious figures from Gasa Dzong were abolished. Female yaks were distributed by the government in a bid to encourage livestock production.
