= Mountains of Bhutan =

Highlands of Bhutan

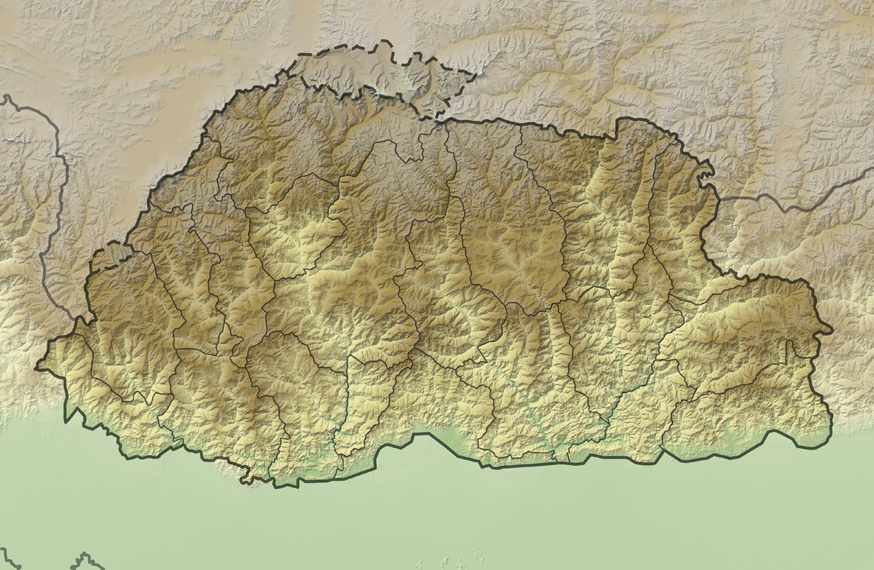

Relief map of Bhutan showing its districts

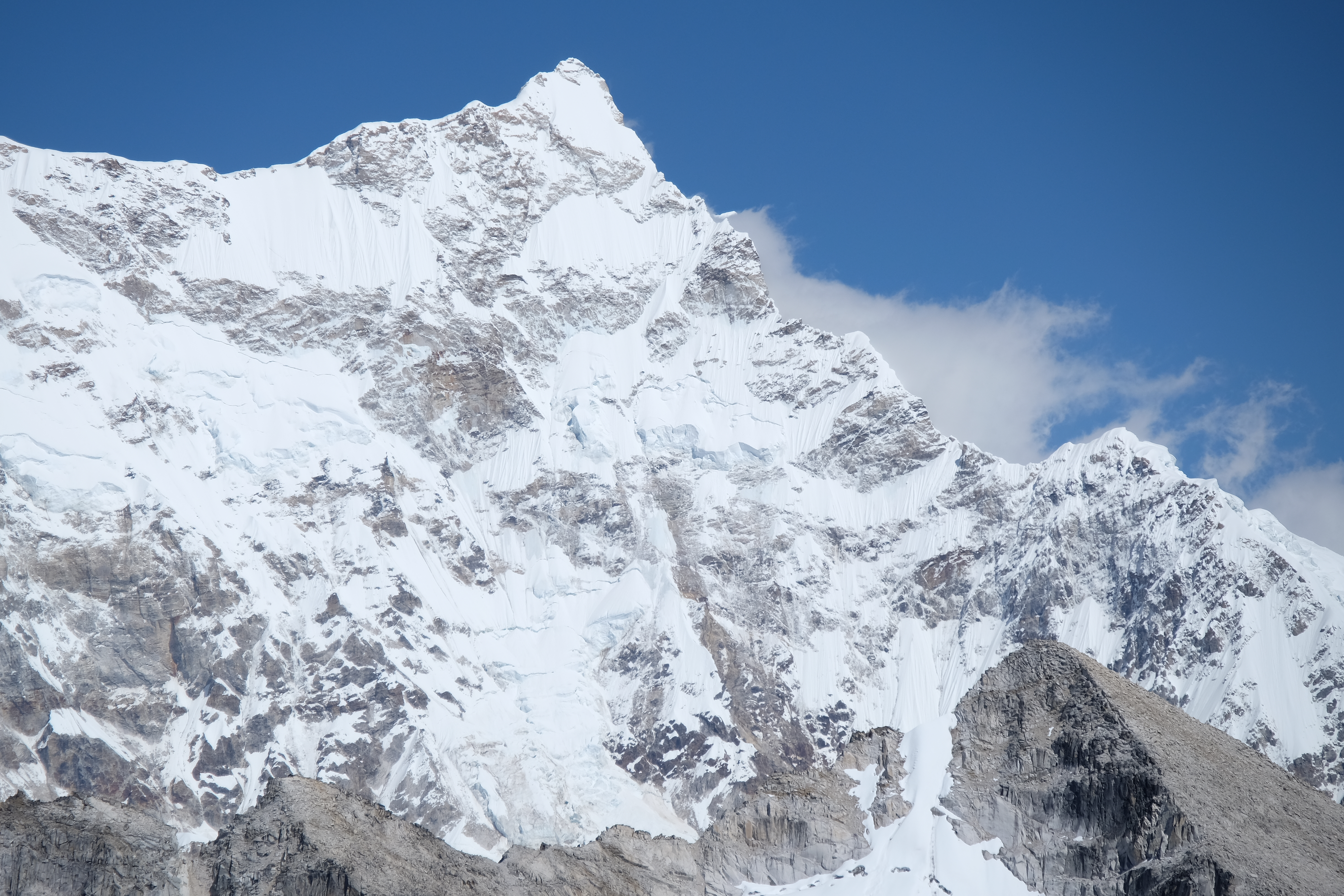
Summit of Gangkhar Puensum

The mountains of Bhutan are some of the most prominent natural geographic features of the kingdom.

== Overview ==
Located on the southern end of the Eastern Himalaya, Bhutan has one of the most rugged mountain terrains in the world, whose elevations range from 160 metres (520 ft) to more than 7,000 metres (23,000 ft) above sea level, in some cases within distances of less than 100 kilometres (62 mi) of each other. Bhutan's highest peak, at 7,570 metres (24,840 ft) above sea level, is north-central Gangkhar Puensum, close to the border with Tibet; the third highest peak, Jomolhari, overlooking the Chumbi Valley in the west, is 7,314 metres (23,996 ft) above sea level; nineteen other peaks exceed 7,000 metres (23,000 ft). Weather is extreme in the mountains: the high peaks have perpetual snow, and the lesser mountains and hewn gorges have high winds all year round, making them barren brown wind tunnels in summer, and frozen wastelands in winter. The blizzards generated in the north each winter often drift southward into the central highlands.

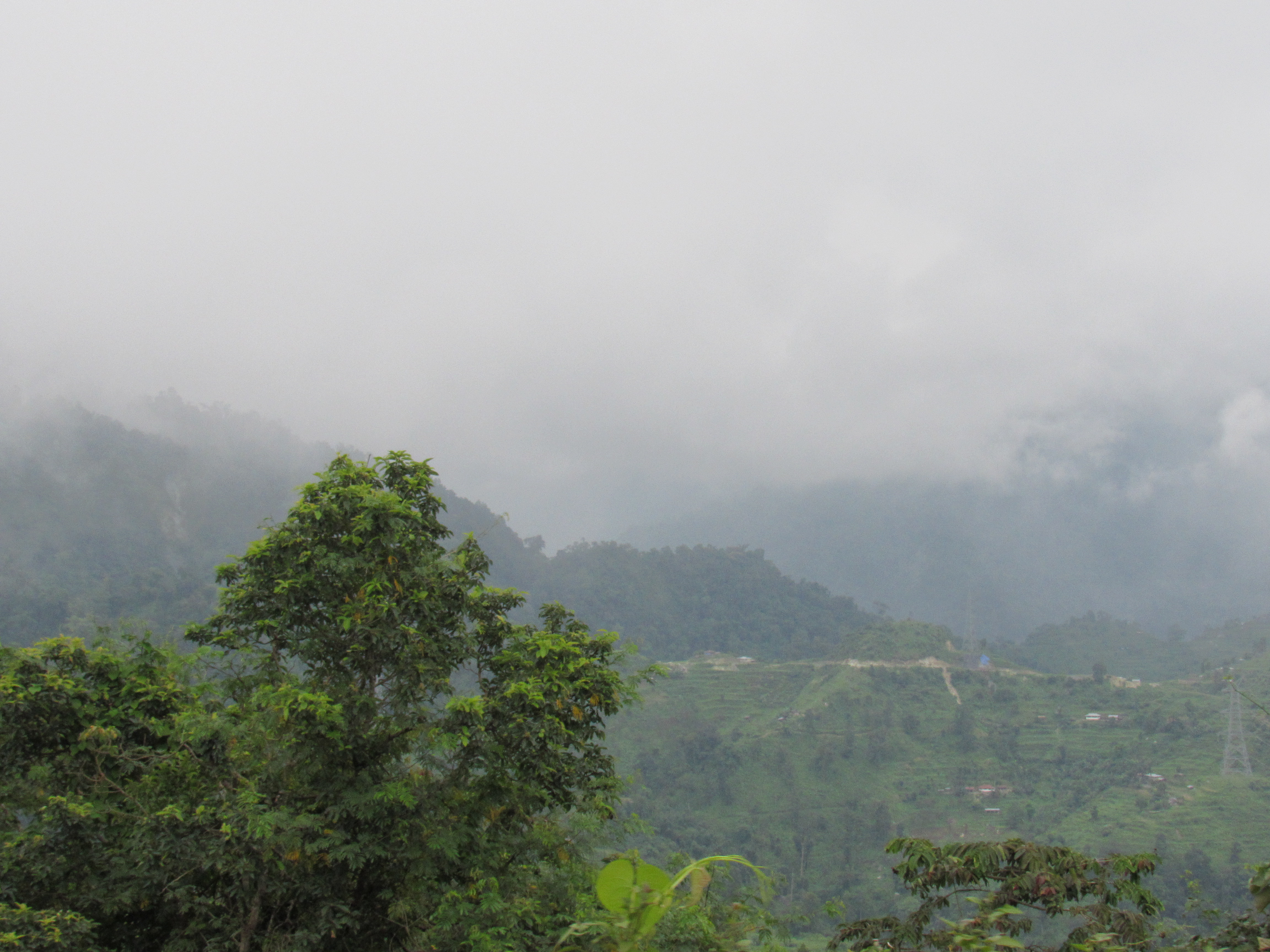
Cloud covering green mountain in Bhutan

The mountains of Bhutan define its three main geographic zones: the Great Himalaya, the Lower Himalayan Range (or Inner Himalaya), and the Sub-Himalayan Range. The snowcapped Great Himalaya in the north ranges from about 5,500 metres (18,000 ft) to peaks of over 7,500 metres (24,600 ft) above sea level, extending along the Bhutan-Tibet border. The northern region consists of an arc of glaciated mountain peaks with an arctic climate at the highest elevations. Watered by snow-fed rivers, alpine valleys in this region provide pasturage for livestock tended by a sparse population of migratory shepherds. Spur-like mountain ranges of the Lower Himalaya, between 1,500 metres (4,900 ft) and 5,500 metres (18,000 ft), run northwest to southeast in western Bhutan, and northeast to southwest in eastern Bhutan. These mountains, and especially their western valleys, make up the economic and cultural heart of the kingdom, including most of its dzongs. These mountainous areas are contrasted with the hilly Sub-Himalaya, with elevations of up to 1,500 metres (4,900 ft), and the lower Duars. Many lower mountain ranges are composed of coarse granite sandstone, while rocks at the highest elevations consist of gneiss among upheaved strata of mica and talcose slate. Many ranges are abundant in limestone.

Bhutan's valleys are carved into the Himalaya by its rivers, fed by glacial melt and monsoon rains. Much of the Bhutanese population is concentrated in valleys and lowlands, separated by the rugged southward spurs of the Inner Himalaya. Despite modernization and development of transport in Bhutan, including a national highway system, travel from one valley to the next remains difficult. Western valleys are bound to the east by the Black Mountains in central Bhutan, which form a watershed between two major river systems, the Sankosh River and the Drangme Chhu. Central valleys are separated from the east by the Donga Range. The more isolated mountain valleys protect several tiny, distinct cultural and linguistic groups.

Bhutan controls several strategic Himalayan mountain passes including routes between Tibet and Assam. These routes, being the only way into the kingdom, along with centuries-old policies of isolationism, have gained Bhutan the nickname "Mountain Fortress of the Gods." Although the British established a protectorate over Bhutan and occupied its lowlands, the mountainous interior has never been successfully invaded.

== Great Himalayas ==
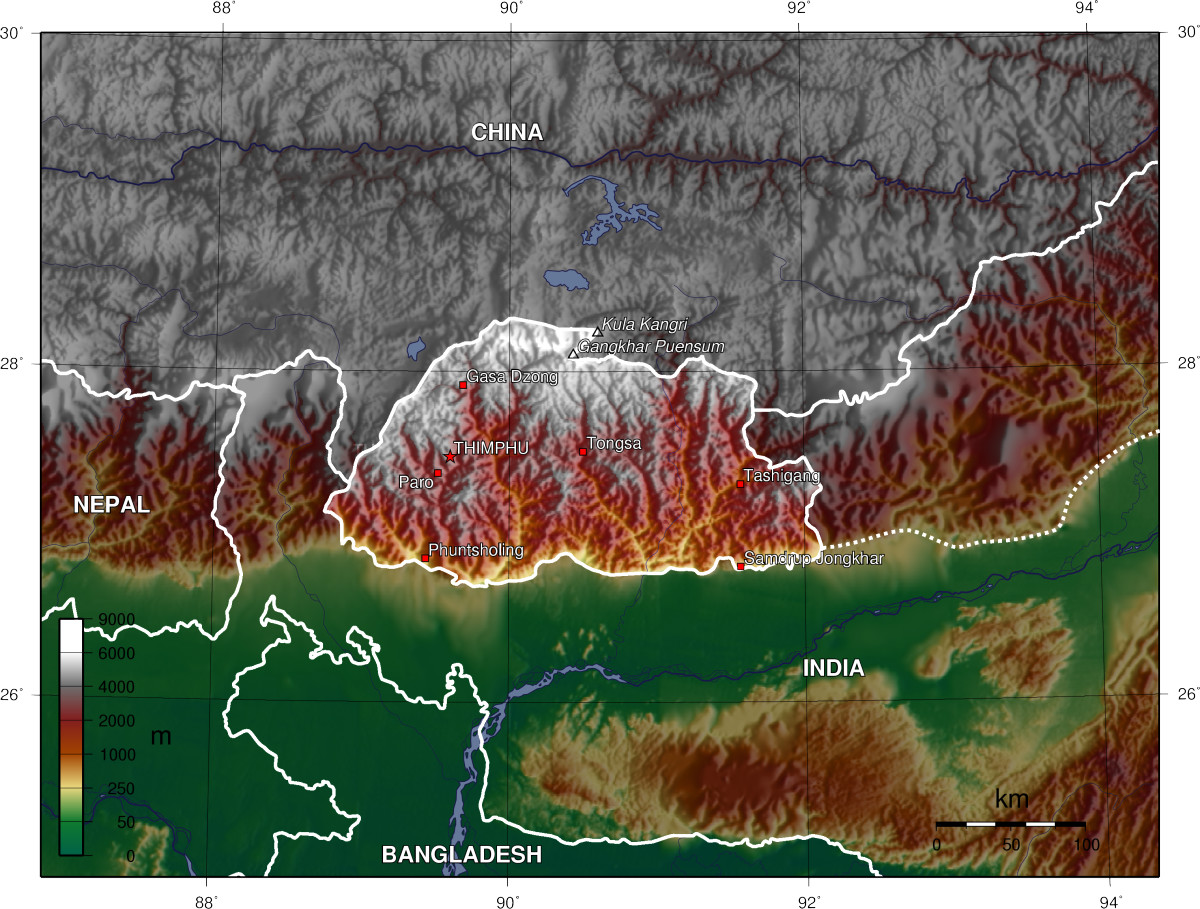
Mountains and valleys dominate the topography of Bhutan.

The mountains of the Great Himalayas dominate the north of Bhutan, where peaks can easily reach 7,000 metres (23,000 ft). The tallest peaks range, from west to east, along northern Haa, Paro and Thimphu Districts; the bulk of Gasa District; northernmost Wangdue Phodrang District; and northern Bumthang and Lhuentse Districts. The highest point in Bhutan is Gangkhar Puensum, which has the distinction of being the highest unclimbed mountain in the world, at 7,570 metres (24,840 ft). Some massive summits such as Gangkhar Puensum, Kula Kangri, and Tongshanjiabu lie in territory disputed among Bhutan and China. According to Bhutanese claims, these giants should be part of Gasa District. Other peaks of the Great Himalaya, such as Mount Jitchu Drake, lie squarely within Gasa.

The Great Himalaya contains most of the glaciers of Bhutan. This region contains the vast majority of Bhutan's 677 glaciers and 2,674 glacial lakes and subsidiary lakes, out of which 25 pose a risk of GLOFs. The vast number of glaciers in Bhutan are classed as "valley" and "mountain glaciers," although significant numbers of "ice apron," and "niche glacier" types also exist. Some glacial lakes, such as Thorthormi Lake in Lunana Gewog, are not single bodies of water but collections supraglacial ponds.

== Lower Himalayan Range ==
The Lower Himalayan Ranges, also called the Inner Himalaya, are southward spurs of the Great Himalaya, dominating the midsection of Bhutan. The Dongkya Range forms the trijunction of the Bhutan-Sikkim-Tibet border, separating Sikkim from the Chumbi Valley The Black Mountains in central Bhutan form a watershed between two major river systems, the Mo Chhu and the Drangme Chhu. Peaks in the Black Mountains range between 1,500 metres (4,900 ft) and 2,700 metres (8,900 ft) above sea level. Eastern Bhutan is divided by another southward spur, the Donga Range, whose valleys tend to be steeper ravines.

Unlike the Great Himalaya, there are no glaciers in the Inner Himalayan ranges, though some summits and upper slopes are covered with moraines.

=== Black Mountains ===
The Black Mountains, lie to the east of the Sankosh River. Midway between Punakha and Trongsa, they separate western Bhutan from the ethnolinguistically diverse central regions and the densely populated eastern regions. The Black Mountains themselves spur ramifications to the southwest and southeast, reaching into Trongsa District. Pele La pass at 3,350 metres (10,990 ft) is historically and modernly the most important pass in the Black Mountains.

The isolation of populations in the Black Mountain area has produced great linguistic and ethnic diversity: it is the home of the Lakha, Nyenkha, and 'Olekha languages, representing distantly related Tibetan and East Bodish language groups.

Between Trongsa and Jakar runs another mountain range, crossed by Yuto La pass (also called Yotong La). Continuing east, there is another ridge between Jakar and the Kuri Chhu valley, crossed by Ura La pass in Ura Gewog at 3,600 metres (11,800 ft).

=== Donga Range ===
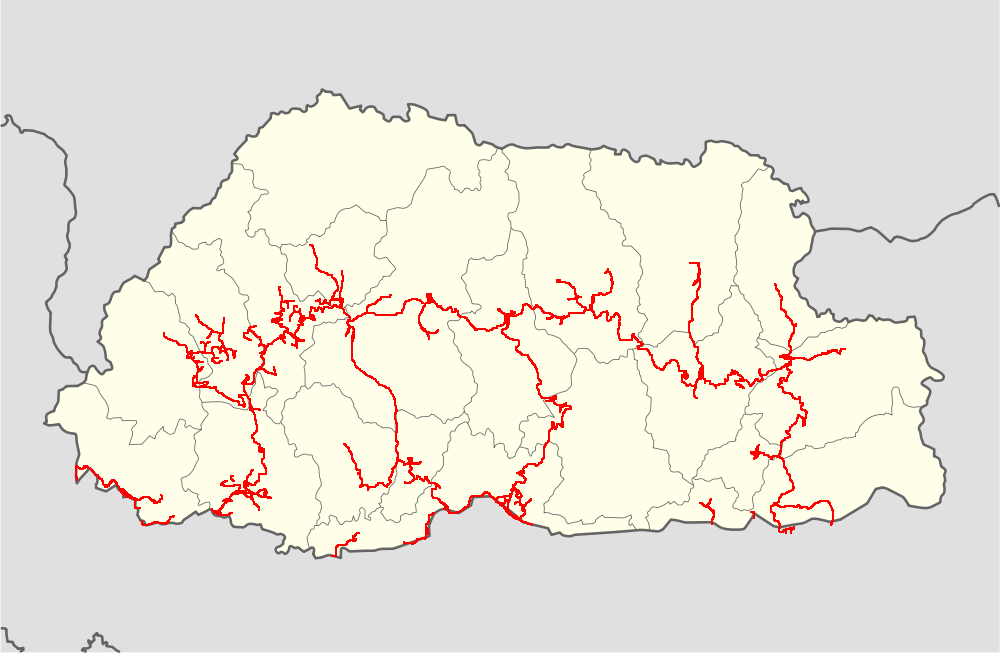
Thrumshing La on the Lateral Road

The steep Donga Range separates Bumthang and Lhuentse Districts and forms the watershed between the Raidāk and Manas River systems. Northeastern portions of the Donga are known as Kurtoe (modern Kurtoe Gewog, historical Kurtoed Province). Thrumshing La pass, also called Donga Pass, provides the only road access across the Donga Range at 3,787 metres (12,425 ft). The steep Rodang La further north provides non-motor communication, and several southerly passes including Thebong La are used by herders. At 20,965 feet (6,390 m), a major peak stands over Thrumshing La.

To the east runs another lesser spur of mountains separating Lhuentse and Trashiyangse Valleys.

=== Tawang Range ===
To the east of the Manas River system, the Tawang Range (also called Kollong) forms the eastern boundary of Bhutan. The Tawang Range originates in Tibet, to the northeast of Arunachal Pradesh.

== List of mountains ==
Mountain	Metres	Feet	District
Gangkhar Puensum	7,570	24,840	Gasa (Note: These territories are disputed.)
Teri Kang	7,125	23,376	
Chomolhari Kang	7,046	23,117	Soe Gewog
Jitchu Drake	6,714	22,028	Soe Gewog
Tongshanjiabu	7,207	23,645	Gasa
Kula Kangri	7,538	24,731	Gasa
Jomolhari	7,326	24,035	Thimphu
Kangphu Kang	7,204	23,635	Gasa
Liankang Kangri	7,535	24,721	Gasa
Masang Kang	7,194	23,602	Gasa
Gangchenta	6,678	21,909	Gasa
Tserim Kang	6,532	21,430	Thimphu
Tsenda Kang	6,481	21,263	Gasa

== See also ==
- Extreme points of Bhutan
- Geography of Bhutan
- Valleys of Bhutan
