= Geography of Bhutan =

Bhutan

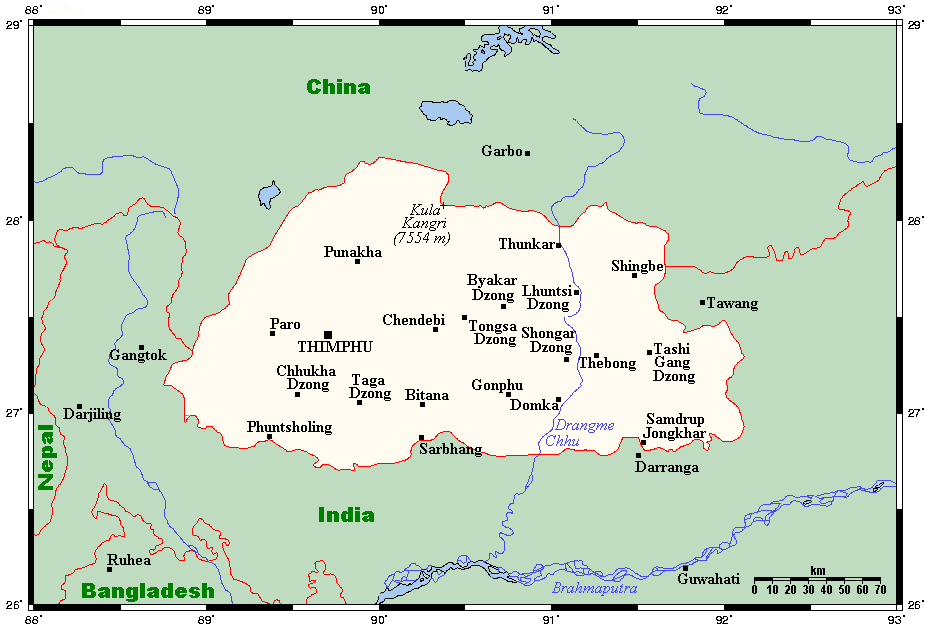
Bhutan's towns and villages

Continent
Asia
Subregion
South Asia
Geographic coordinates
27°30′N 90°30′E
Area
- Total
- Water
Ranked 137th
38,394 km^{2} (14,824.0 sq mi)
0 km^{2} (0 sq mi) (landlocked)
Coastline
0 km (0 mi)
Land boundaries
1,136 km (706 mi)
Countries bordered
China 477 km (296 mi),
India 659 km (409 mi)
Highest point
Gangkhar Puensum, 7,570 m (24,836 ft)
Lowest point
Drangme Chhu, 97 m (318 ft)
Longest river

Largest inland body of water

Land Use
- Arable land
- Permanent crops
- Other

2.62%
0.34%
97.27% (2012 est.)
Irrigated Land
319.1 km^{2} (123.2 sq mi) (2010)
Climate:
Varies; tropical in southern plains; cool winters and hot summers in central valleys; severe winters and cool summers in Himalayas
Natural resources
timber, hydropower, gypsum, calcium carbonate
Natural hazards
Violent storms from the Himalayas are the source of the country's name, which translates as Land of the Thunder Dragon; frequent landslides during the rainy season
Environmental issues
soil erosion; limited access to potable water

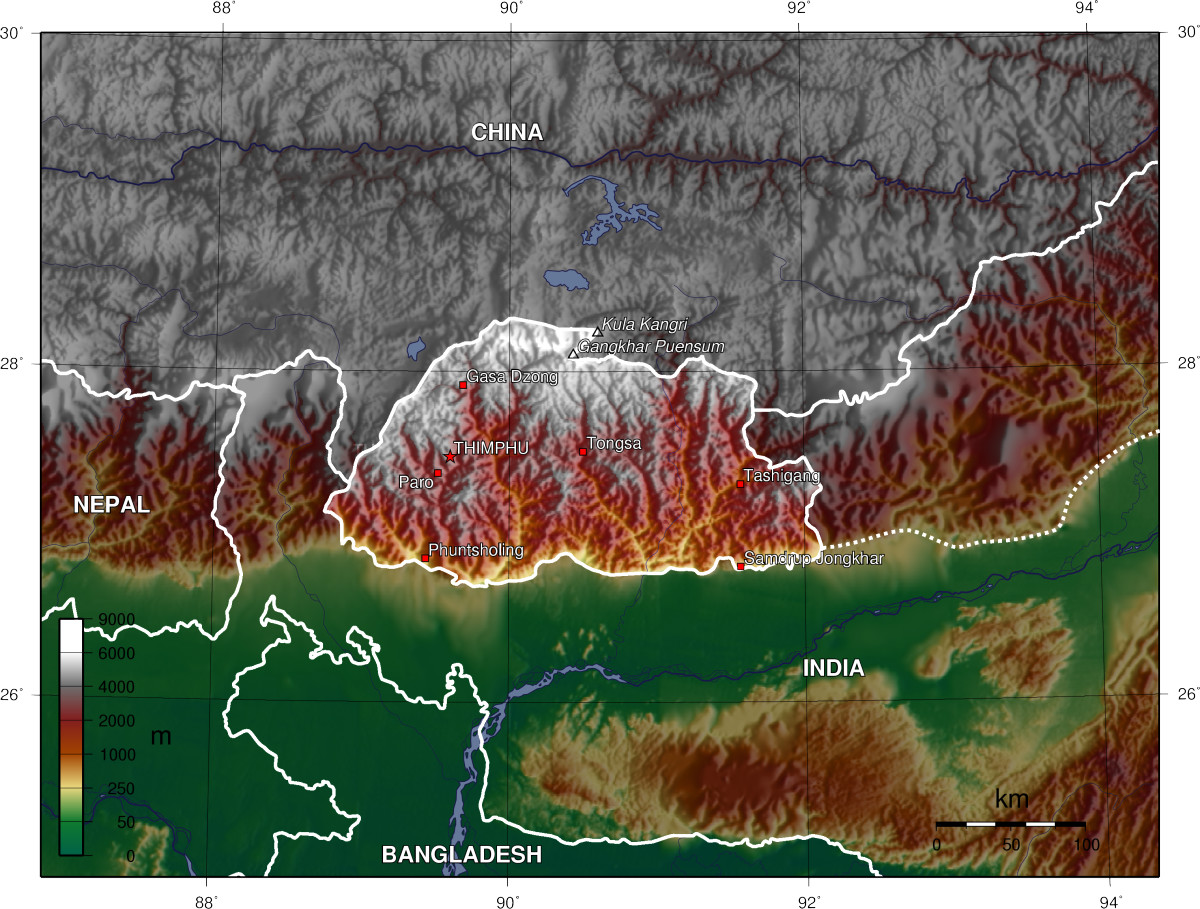
Topographic map of Bhutan

Bhutan is a sovereign country at the crossroads of East Asia and South Asia, located towards the eastern extreme of the Himalayas mountain range. It is fairly evenly sandwiched between the sovereign territory of two nations: first, the People's Republic of China (PRC) on the north and northwest. There are approximately 477 kilometres (296 mi) of border with the country's Tibet Autonomous Region (TAR), or simply Tibet. The second nation is the Republic of India on the south, southwest, and east; there are approximately 659 kilometres (409 mi) with the states of Arunachal Pradesh, Assam, West Bengal, and Sikkim, in clockwise order from the kingdom. Bhutan's total borders amount to approximately 1,139 kilometres (708 mi).

Bhutan is a very compact landlocked nation, but with just a small bit more length than width. The nation's territory totals an approximate 38,394 square kilometres (14,824 sq mi). Because of its inland, landlocked status, it controls no territorial waters. Bhutan's territory used to extend south into present-day Assam, including the protectorate of Cooch Behar, but, starting from 1772, the British East India Company (EIC) began to push back the borders through a number of wars and treaties, severely reducing Bhutan's size until the Treaty of Sinchula of 1865, when some border land was ceded back. Later, many of these territories were permanently lost to British India under the Treaty of Punakha and today remains a part of modern-day India.

== Political geography ==
Bhutan is divided into 20 dzongkhags (districts), and further into 205 gewogs (village blocks). Gewogs are in turn divided into numerous thromdes (municipalities) for administration.

== Physical geography ==
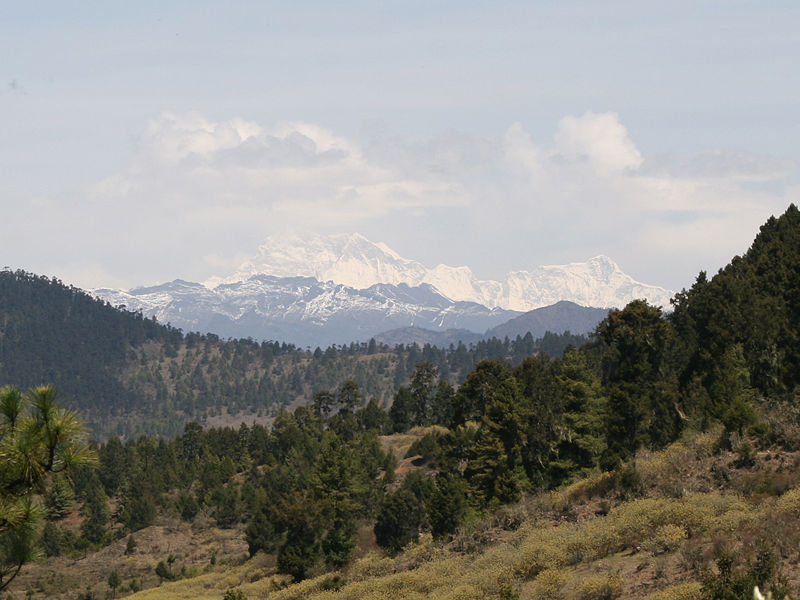
Gangkhar Puensum from Ura La, Bhutan

The Himalaya mountains of Bhutan dominate the north of the country, where peaks can easily reach 7,000 metres (22,966 ft); the highest point in Bhutan is Gangkhar Puensum, which has the distinction of being the highest unclimbed mountain in the world, at 7,570 metres (24,840 ft). Weather is extreme in the mountains: the high peaks have perpetual snow, and the lesser mountains and hewn gorges have high winds all year round, making them barren brown wind tunnels in summer, and frozen wastelands in winter. The blizzards generated in the north each winter often drift southward into the central highlands.

Below the rock and ice of the highest peaks lies an extensive arc of Eastern Himalayan alpine shrub and meadows, which contain, in additions to grasslands, a wide variety of rhododendrons and herbaceous plants.

The highlands are the most populous part of the nation; the capital Thimphu lies in the western region. The region is characterised by its many rivers (flowing into India's Brahmaputra), its isolated valleys that house most of the population, and the expansive forests that cover seventy per cent of the nation. The highlands have Eastern Himalayan subalpine conifer forests at higher elevations and Eastern Himalayan broadleaf forests at lower elevations. Winters are cold, summer are hot; the rainy season is accompanied with high-frequency landslides.

The valleys of Bhutan are linked by a series of passes ("La" in Dzongkha). Between the Haa Valley and Paro Valley is the Chele La (3,780 metres (12,402 ft)). The Chele La is the highest pass crossed by a Bhutanese highway. The Lateral Road from Thimphu to Punakha crosses the Dochu La (3,116 metres (10,223 ft)), which features 108 chortens built to commemorate the expulsion of Assamese guerrillas. East of Wangdue Phodrang is the Pele La (3,390 metres (11,122 ft)). Continuing to the east along the main highway, other major passes include the Yotang La, Shertang La, Wangthang La, Thrumshing La and Kori La (2,298 metres (7,539 ft)).

The extreme southern strip of the nation consists mostly of Himalayan subtropical broadleaf forests that grade into the tropical plains of the Terai-Duar savanna and grasslands, more typical of India. It is largely agricultural land, producing mostly rice. Only two per cent of Bhutan is arable land, with most of it focused here.

Centuries of isolationism, a small population, and topographical extremes have led to Bhutan maintaining one of the most intact ecosystems in the world. The country ranks amongst the top ten countries in the world in terms of species density (species richness per unit area). Over fifty-five hundred varieties of plant life exist, including around 300 medicinal ones. More than 770 species of avifauna and more than 165 species of mammals are known to exist, including many rare and endangered species like the red panda, snow leopard, and golden langur.

== Strategic location ==
Bhutan, situated between India and China, is a potential Sino-Indian battleground; India currently has more political influence in the nation. This stems from two things: the fact that after the British granted sovereignty to their South Asian possessions, Bhutan, a protectorate, was never put under the administration of India, except for its Foreign Relation Policies under the Indo-Bhutan Treaty of 1949. The Indian Army patrols Bhutan's frontiers and has played a major role in the development of the country's road infrastructure. Additionally, the Government of India continues to provide approximately 60% of Bhutan's government finances.

The second reason comes from the aggression against Tibet by China from 1949 to 1959; the Tibetans have strong cultural, historical, and religious connections to Bhutan.

Bhutan controls several strategic mountain passes through the Himalayas, allowing travel between Tibet and Assam. These passes are also the only way into the kingdom, and, coupled with its centuries-old policies of isolationism, it has been called the "Mountain Fortress of the Gods." The heartland of Bhutan has never been successfully invaded; the British, while establishing a protectorate over the nation, did so with threats to the low-lying territories below the highlands.

== Climate ==
Köppen-Geiger climate classification map for Bhutan

Bhutan's climate is as varied as its altitudes and, like India's, is affected by monsoons. Western Bhutan is particularly affected by monsoons that bring between 60 and 90 per cent of the region's rainfall. The climate is humid and subtropical in the southern plains and foothills, temperate in the inner Himalayan valleys of the southern and central regions, and cold in the north, with year-round snow on the main Himalayan summits.

Temperatures vary according to elevation. Temperatures in Thimphu, located at 2,200 metres (7,218 ft) above sea level in west-central Bhutan, range from approximately 15 to 26 °C (59.0 to 78.8 °F) during the monsoon season of June through September but drop to between about −4 and 16 °C (24.8 and 60.8 °F) in January. Most of the central portion of the country experiences a cool, temperate climate year-round. In the south, a hot, humid climate helps maintain a fairly even temperature range of between 15 and 30 °C (59 and 86 °F) year-round, although temperatures sometimes reach 40 °C (104 °F) in the valleys during the summer.

Annual precipitation ranges widely in various parts of the country. In the severe climate of the north, there is only about 40 millimetres (1.6 in) of annual precipitation—primarily snow. In the temperate central regions, a yearly average of around 1,000 millimetres (39.4 in) is more common, and 7,800 millimetres (307.1 in) per year has been registered at some locations in the humid, subtropical south, ensuring the thick tropical forest, or savanna. Thimphu experiences dry winter months (December through February) and almost no precipitation until March, when rainfall averages 20 millimetres (0.79 in) a month and increases steadily thereafter to a high of 220 millimetres (8.7 in) in August for a total annual rainfall of nearly 650 millimetres (25.6 in).

Bhutan's generally dry spring starts in early March and lasts until mid-April. Summer weather commences in mid-April with occasional showers and continues through the pre-monsoon rains of late June. The summer monsoon lasts from late June through late September with heavy rains from the southwest. The monsoon weather, blocked from its northward progress by the Himalayas, brings heavy rains, high humidity, flash floods and landslides, and numerous misty, overcast days. Autumn, from late September or early October to late November, follows the rainy season. It is characterised by bright, sunny days and some early snowfalls at higher elevations. From late November until March, winter sets in, with frost throughout much of the country and snowfall common above elevations of 3,000 metres (9,843 ft). The winter northeast monsoon brings gale-force winds down through high mountain passes.

Climate data for Thimphu-Simtokha (1996-2017)
Month	Jan	Feb	Mar	Apr	May	Jun	Jul	Aug	Sep	Oct	Nov	Dec	Year
Record high °C (°F)	24.0 (75.2)	25.0 (77.0)	28.0 (82.4)	30.0 (86.0)	32.2 (90.0)	32.0 (89.6)	33.0 (91.4)	32.5 (90.5)	31.0 (87.8)	31.0 (87.8)	27.0 (80.6)	24.0 (75.2)	33.0 (91.4)
Mean daily maximum °C (°F)	14.8 (58.6)	16.6 (61.9)	19.3 (66.7)	22.4 (72.3)	24.8 (76.6)	26.7 (80.1)	27.0 (80.6)	27.3 (81.1)	26.0 (78.8)	23.7 (74.7)	19.7 (67.5)	16.6 (61.9)	22.1 (71.7)
Daily mean °C (°F)	6.3 (43.3)	8.5 (47.3)	11.6 (52.9)	15.1 (59.2)	18.2 (64.8)	21.0 (69.8)	21.8 (71.2)	21.7 (71.1)	20.3 (68.5)	16.3 (61.3)	11.5 (52.7)	7.9 (46.2)	15.0 (59.0)
Mean daily minimum °C (°F)	−2.2 (28.0)	0.3 (32.5)	3.8 (38.8)	7.9 (46.2)	11.6 (52.9)	15.3 (59.5)	16.5 (61.7)	16.1 (61.0)	14.6 (58.3)	9.0 (48.2)	3.2 (37.8)	−0.8 (30.6)	8.0 (46.4)
Record low °C (°F)	−8.5 (16.7)	−7.0 (19.4)	−7.0 (19.4)	−2.0 (28.4)	2.5 (36.5)	8.0 (46.4)	11.0 (51.8)	9.0 (48.2)	6.0 (42.8)	−3.0 (26.6)	−6.0 (21.2)	−7.5 (18.5)	−8.5 (16.7)
Average rainfall mm (inches)	6.3 (0.25)	9.2 (0.36)	20.4 (0.80)	29.9 (1.18)	49.8 (1.96)	97.7 (3.85)	152.8 (6.02)	120.8 (4.76)	73.9 (2.91)	43.1 (1.70)	1.2 (0.05)	3.7 (0.15)	608.9 (23.97)
Average relative humidity (%)	68.6	62.6	62.8	60.2	63.2	67.0	72.7	72.2	71.2	66.6	62.1	64.0	66.1
Source: National Center for Hydrology and Meteorology

Climate data for Phuntsholing (1996-2017)
Month	Jan	Feb	Mar	Apr	May	Jun	Jul	Aug	Sep	Oct	Nov	Dec	Year
Record high °C (°F)	33.0 (91.4)	33.8 (92.8)	38.0 (100.4)	37.0 (98.6)	39.0 (102.2)	38.0 (100.4)	39.0 (102.2)	40.0 (104.0)	39.0 (102.2)	38.0 (100.4)	36.9 (98.4)	35.0 (95.0)	40.0 (104.0)
Mean daily maximum °C (°F)	23.9 (75.0)	26.6 (79.9)	29.8 (85.6)	31.1 (88.0)	32.3 (90.1)	32.3 (90.1)	31.9 (89.4)	32.3 (90.1)	31.7 (89.1)	31.2 (88.2)	28.7 (83.7)	25.4 (77.7)	29.8 (85.6)
Daily mean °C (°F)	18.6 (65.5)	21.5 (70.7)	24.2 (75.6)	25.6 (78.1)	27.0 (80.6)	27.7 (81.9)	27.8 (82.0)	28.1 (82.6)	27.4 (81.3)	26.2 (79.2)	23.3 (73.9)	20.2 (68.4)	24.8 (76.6)
Mean daily minimum °C (°F)	13.4 (56.1)	16.3 (61.3)	18.5 (65.3)	20.1 (68.2)	21.7 (71.1)	23.1 (73.6)	23.7 (74.7)	23.8 (74.8)	23.1 (73.6)	21.1 (70.0)	17.9 (64.2)	15.0 (59.0)	19.8 (67.7)
Record low °C (°F)	5.0 (41.0)	9.0 (48.2)	12.0 (53.6)	14.3 (57.7)	15.1 (59.2)	16.0 (60.8)	17.0 (62.6)	19.0 (66.2)	17.0 (62.6)	14.0 (57.2)	10.0 (50.0)	7.5 (45.5)	5.0 (41.0)
Average rainfall mm (inches)	17.3 (0.68)	31.1 (1.22)	80.2 (3.16)	216.5 (8.52)	380.3 (14.97)	807.2 (31.78)	962.6 (37.90)	779.1 (30.67)	492.6 (19.39)	162.9 (6.41)	13.2 (0.52)	10.4 (0.41)	3,953.4 (155.63)
Average relative humidity (%)	72.4	71.3	70.0	74.7	80.1	83.8	88.5	87.1	84.4	75.6	70.7	72.4	77.6
Source: National Center for Hydrology and Meteorology

== Glaciers ==
Glaciers in northern Bhutan, which covered about 10 per cent of the total surface area in the 1980s, are an important renewable source of water for Bhutan's rivers. Fed by fresh snow each winter and slow melting in the summer, the glaciers bring millions of litres of fresh water to Bhutan and downriver areas each year. Glacial melt adds to monsoon-swollen rivers, however, also contributes to flooding. Where glacial movement temporary blocks riverflows, downstream areas may be threatened by glacial lake outburst floods (GLOFs), also called jökulhlaups.

Bhutan's glaciers are melting. A 2008 United Nations report suggested that due to rising temperatures, glaciers in Bhutan were retreating at a rate of 30–40 metres (100–130 ft) per year, poised to make many lakes burst their banks and send millions of gallons of floodwater downstream. This among many other climate-related issues identified in the report prompted the regional association of government ministers to establish the Southeast Asia Regional Health Emergency Fund in Thimphu in September 2007. Similarly, the member nations of South Asian Association for Regional Cooperation (SAARC) adopted bilateral agreements including measures on climate change and glaciers at its summit in April 2010.

The 2008 UN report also indicated Himalayan glaciers would melt within 25 years, however Prime Minister Jigme Thinley expressed a more dim outlook in a press conference in late March 2010, stating, "Our glaciers are withdrawing very fast and we have reasons to worry that they may in fact disappear not in 2035, but even earlier."

The new inventory "Bhutan Glacial Inventory 2018" includes 700 glaciers covering total area of 629.55 ± 0.02 km^{2} (243.0706 ± 0.0077 sq mi) in the northern frontiers of Bhutan. Glacier area covers 1.64% of the total land cover in Bhutan.

== Lakes ==
Bhutan is home to at least 59 natural mountain lakes as well as some 2,674 glacial lakes; about 25 of these glacial lakes are potential GLOF hazards.

Non-glacial lakes in Bhutan cover a total of about 4,250 hectares (16.4 sq mi). Most are located above an altitude of 3,500 metres (11,500 ft), and most have no permanent human settlements nearby, though many are used for grazing yaks and may have scattered temporary settlements.

== River systems ==
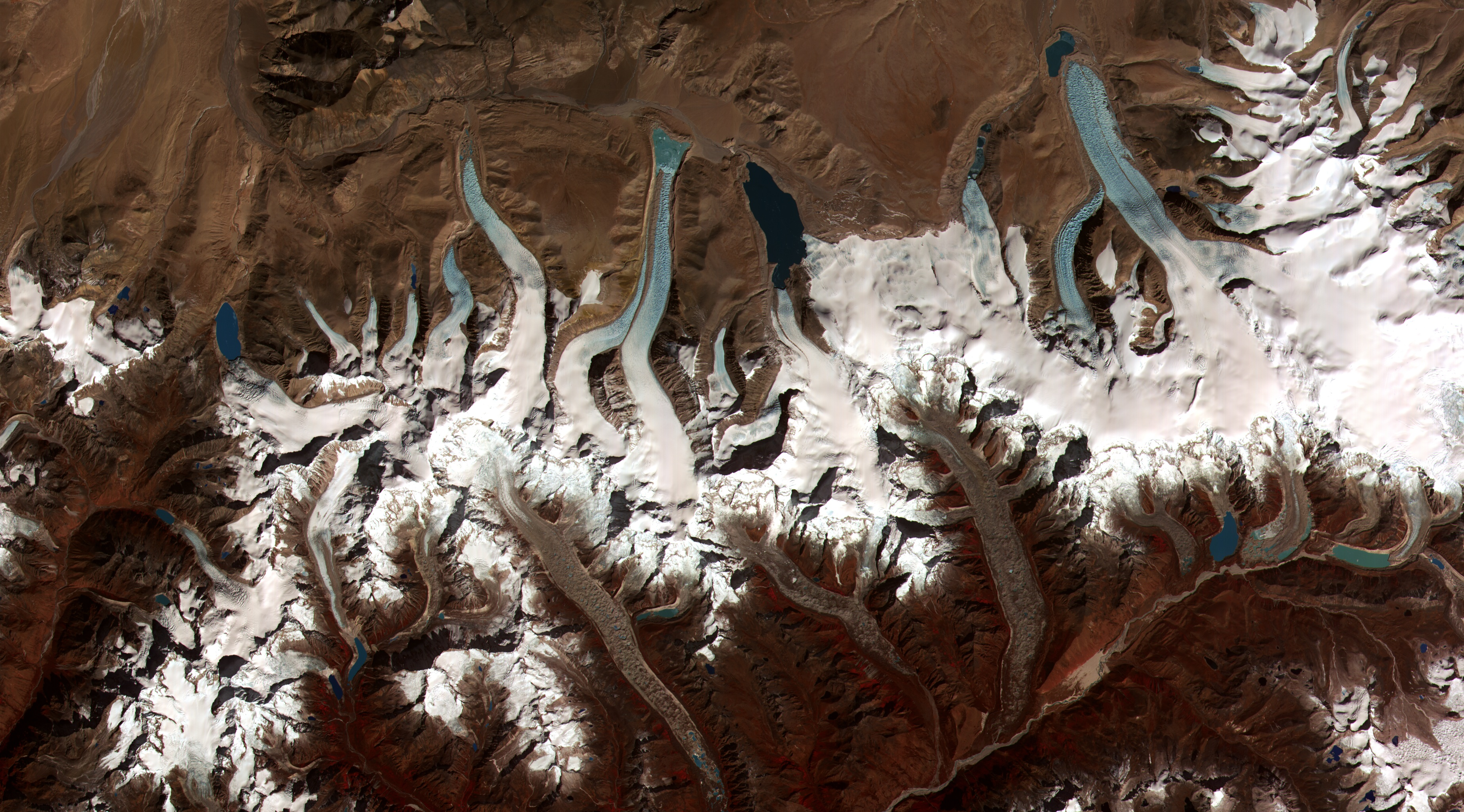
This image shows the termini of the glaciers in the Bhutan-Himalaya. Glacial lakes have been rapidly forming on the surface of the debris-covered glaciers in this region during the last few decades.

Bhutan has four major river systems: the Drangme Chhu; the Puna Tsang Chhu, also called the Sankosh; the Wang Chhu; and the Amo Chhu. Each flows swiftly out of the Himalayas, southerly through the Dooars to join the Brahmaputra River in India, and thence through Bangladesh where the Brahmaputra (or Jamuna in Bangladesh) joins the mighty Ganges (or Padma in Bangladesh) to flow into the Bay of Bengal. The largest river system, the Drangme Chhu, flows southwesterly from India's state of Arunachal Pradesh and has three major branches: the Drangme Chhu, Mangde Chhu, and Bumthang Chhu. These branches form the Drangme Chhu basin, which spreads over most of eastern Bhutan and drains the Tongsa and Bumthang valleys. In the Duars, where eight tributaries join it, the Drangme Chhu is called the Manas Chhu. The 320-kilometre-long (200 mi) Puna Tsang Chhu rises in northwestern Bhutan as the Mo Chhu and Pho Chhu, which are fed by the snows from the Great Himalayan Range. They flow southerly to Punakha, where they join to form the Puna Tsang Chhu, which flows southerly into India's state of West Bengal. The tributaries of the 370-kilometre-long (230 mi) Wang Chhu rise in Tibet. The Wang Chhu itself flows southeasterly through west-central Bhutan, drains the Ha, Paro, and Thimphu valleys, and continues into the Duars, where it enters West Bengal as the Raigye Chhu. The smallest river system, the Torsa Chhu, known as the Amo Chhu in its northern reaches, also flows out of Tibet into the Chumbi Valley and swiftly through western Bhutan before broadening near Phuntsholing and then flowing into India.

== Valleys ==
Bhutan's valleys are carved into the Himalaya by its rivers, fed by glacial melt and monsoon rains. Much of the Bhutanese population is concentrated in valleys and lowlands, separated by rugged southward spurs of the Inner Himalaya. Despite modernization and development of transport in Bhutan, including a national highway system, travel from one valley to the next remains difficult. Western valleys are bound to the east by the Black Mountains in central Bhutan, which form a watershed between two major river systems, the Mo Chhu (Sankosh River) and the Drangme Chhu. Central valleys are separated from the east by the Donga Range. The more isolated mountain valleys protect several tiny, distinct cultural and linguistic groups.

== Forests ==
In Bhutan forest cover is around 71% of the total land area, equivalent to 2,725,080 hectares (ha) of forest in 2020, up from 2,506,720 hectares (ha) in 1990. In 2020, naturally regenerating forest covered 2,704,260 hectares (ha) and planted forest covered 20,820 hectares (ha). Of the naturally regenerating forest 15% was reported to be primary forest (consisting of native tree species with no clearly visible indications of human activity) and around 41% of the forest area was found within protected areas. For the year 2015, 100% of the forest area was reported to be under public ownership.

== Rangeland ==
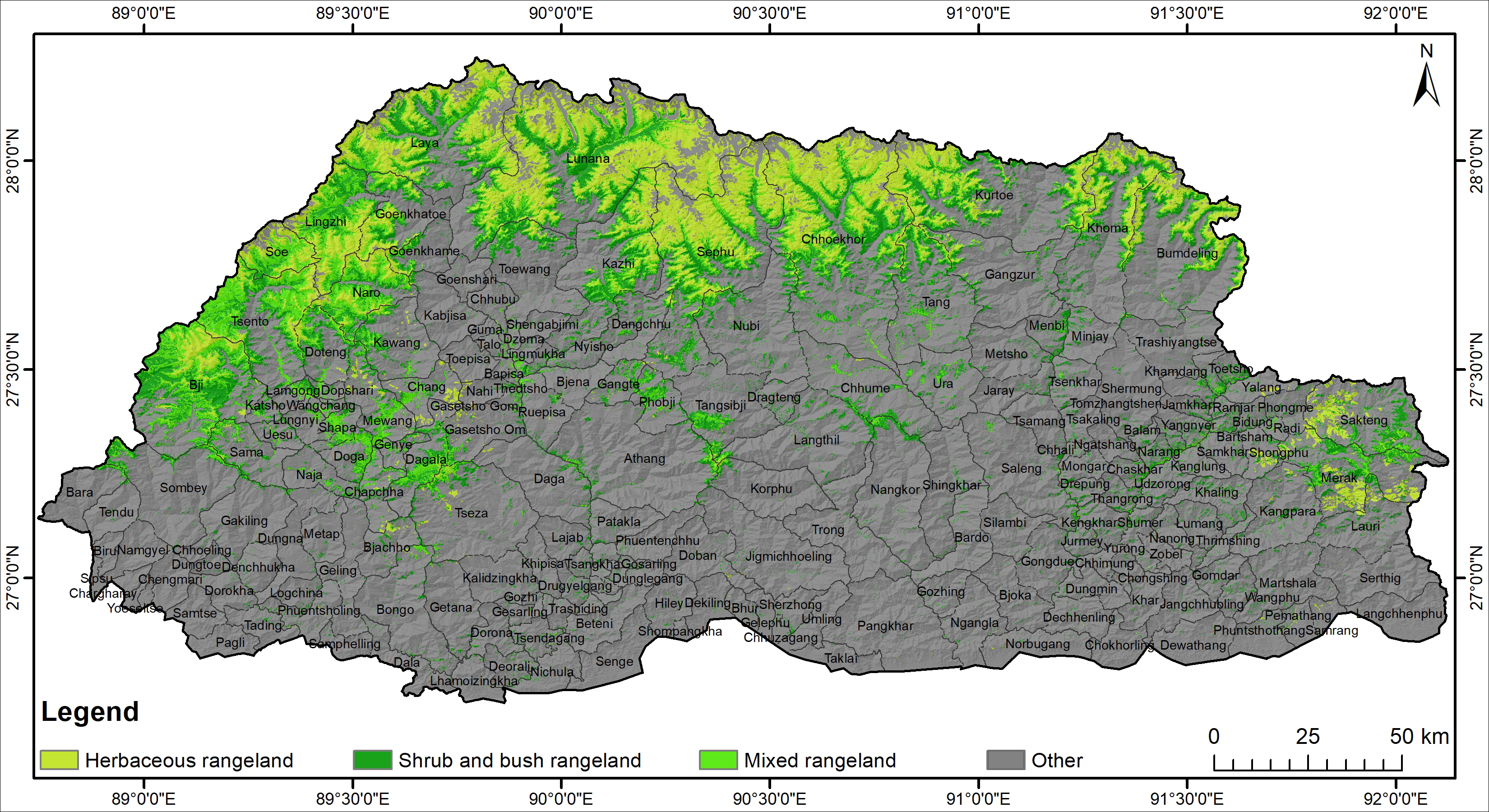
National rangeland map of BhutanNational rangeland map of Bhutan

According to the most recent study on rangeland changes, rangelands in Bhutan are semi-natural ecosystems made up of grasslands, shrublands, and mixed vegetation, mostly found in the montane and alpine regions. They are considered essential for pastoral livelihoods, biodiversity conservation, and the functioning of high-mountain ecosystems. A nationwide assessment estimated that rangelands cover about 9,307 km² of Bhutan’s total land area. This major includes 3,451 km² of herbaceous rangeland, 3,546 km² of shrub and bush rangeland, and 2,310 km² of mixed rangeland. Large rangeland areas occur in districts such as Gasa, Wangdue Phodrang, Bumthang, Thimphu, Paro, and Haa. The ICIMOD study on rangeland area and vegetation change was conducted using a combination of remote sensing techniques and field surveys, which ensures data reliability and comparability. Analysis of vegetation change from 2013 to 2024 shows that most rangelands remain stable. Some areas show increased vegetation greenness, while others show decline, especially in shrub-dominated rangelands. An increase in greenness does not always mean improved rangeland condition, as shrub expansion and invasive species can reduce forage quality. The findings also show that rainfall alone does not determine rangeland condition. Rangeland dynamics are often controlled by a combination of climate variability, topography, grazing pressure, and land-cover change, demonstrating the need for integrated rangeland management in Bhutan.
