= Gangchenta =

Mountain in Bhutan and China

- 岗城达 (Chinese)
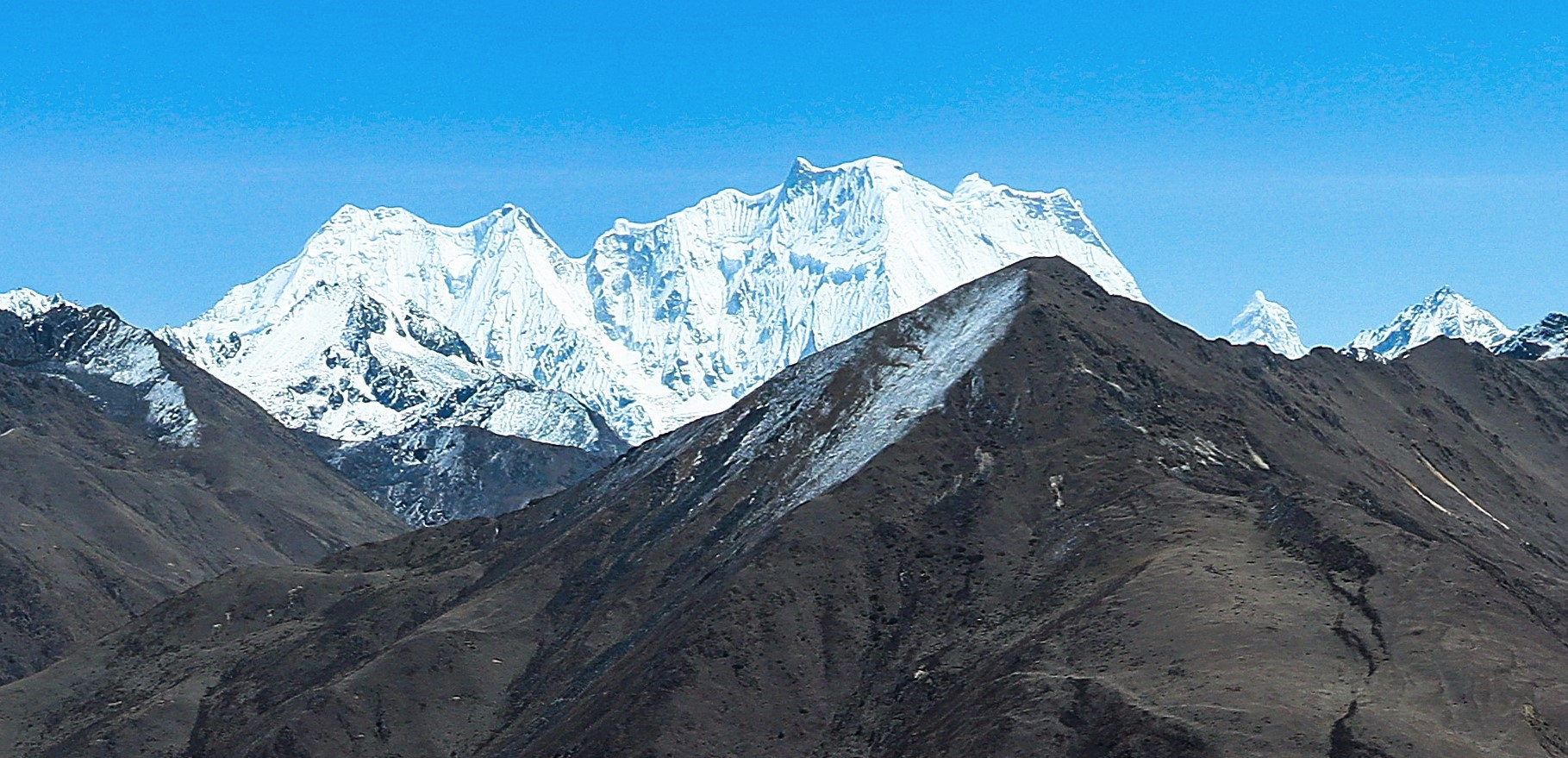
- South aspect

Highest point
- Elevation: 6,678 m (21,909 ft)
- Prominence: 1,495 m (4,905 ft)
- Parent peak: Gangkhar Puensum
- Isolation: 22.85 km (14.20 mi)
- Coordinates: 28°06′11″N 89°32′52″E

Geography
- Location within Bhutan Location within Tibet Location within China
- Interactive map of Gangchenta
- Location: Bhutan–China border
- Countries: Bhutan and China
- Gewog: Laya Gewog
- District: Gasa
- Protected area: Jigme Dorji National Park
- Parent range: Himalayas

Gangchenta is a mountain in Bhutan and Tibet.

== Description ==
Gangchenta is a 6,678-metre (21,909-foot) glaciated summit in the Himalayas on the Bhutan–China border. It is situated 65 kilometres (40 mi) north of Thimphu on the boundary shared by Bhutan's Jigme Dorji National Park and Kangmar County of Tibet. Precipitation runoff from the mountain's southeast slopes drains into the Mo Chhu drainage basin, whereas the northwest slope drains to Dochen Tso in Tibet. Topographic relief is significant as the southeast slope rises 2,078 metres (6,817 ft) in two kilometres (1.2 mi). The nearest higher neighbor is Masang Kang, 22.5 kilometres (14.0 mi) to the east-northeast. Gangchenta, also spelled Kangchenta, translates as "tiger mountain."

== Climate ==
Based on the Köppen climate classification, Gangchenta is located in a tundra climate zone with cold, snowy winters, and cool summers. Weather systems coming off the Bay of Bengal are forced upwards by the Himalaya mountains (orographic lift), causing heavy precipitation in the form of rainfall and snowfall. June through August is the monsoon season. The months of March, April, May, September, October, and November offer the most favorable weather for viewing this peak.

== See also ==
- Geology of the Himalayas
- List of Himalayan peaks and passes
- Mountains of Bhutan
