= Tsenda Kang =

Mountain peak in Bhutan

- Location within Bhutan

Highest point
- Elevation: 6,481 m (21,263 ft)
- Prominence: 951 m (3,120 ft)
- Listing: Mountains of Bhutan
- Coordinates: 28°06′28″N 89°51′32″E

Geography
- Country: Bhutan
- Parent range: Himalayas

Climbing
- First ascent: 1991 by a Japanese team

Tsenda Kang is a mountain in the eastern Himalayas, in northern Bhutan.

== Location ==
The high glaciated mountain peak is located at 6,481 m (21,263 ft) in Jigme Dorji National Park. It lies on the watersheds of its two source rivers. The Mo Chhu drains the northern and western flanks, while precipitation on the eastern flank flows into the western headwaters of the Pho Chhu.

About 13 km northeast is the Tongshanjiabu, 10.7 km northeast is the Teri Kang and 11.5 km northwest rises the Masang Kang.

== Climbing history ==
A Japanese mountaineering group from the Chiba University Alpine Club made the first ascent in 1991. Fumitaka Sakurai, Hiroshi Kodama and Kosuke Honma reached the summit of Tsenda Kang on November 8, 1991, via the west ridge.
