= Pele La =

Mountain pass in Central Bhutan

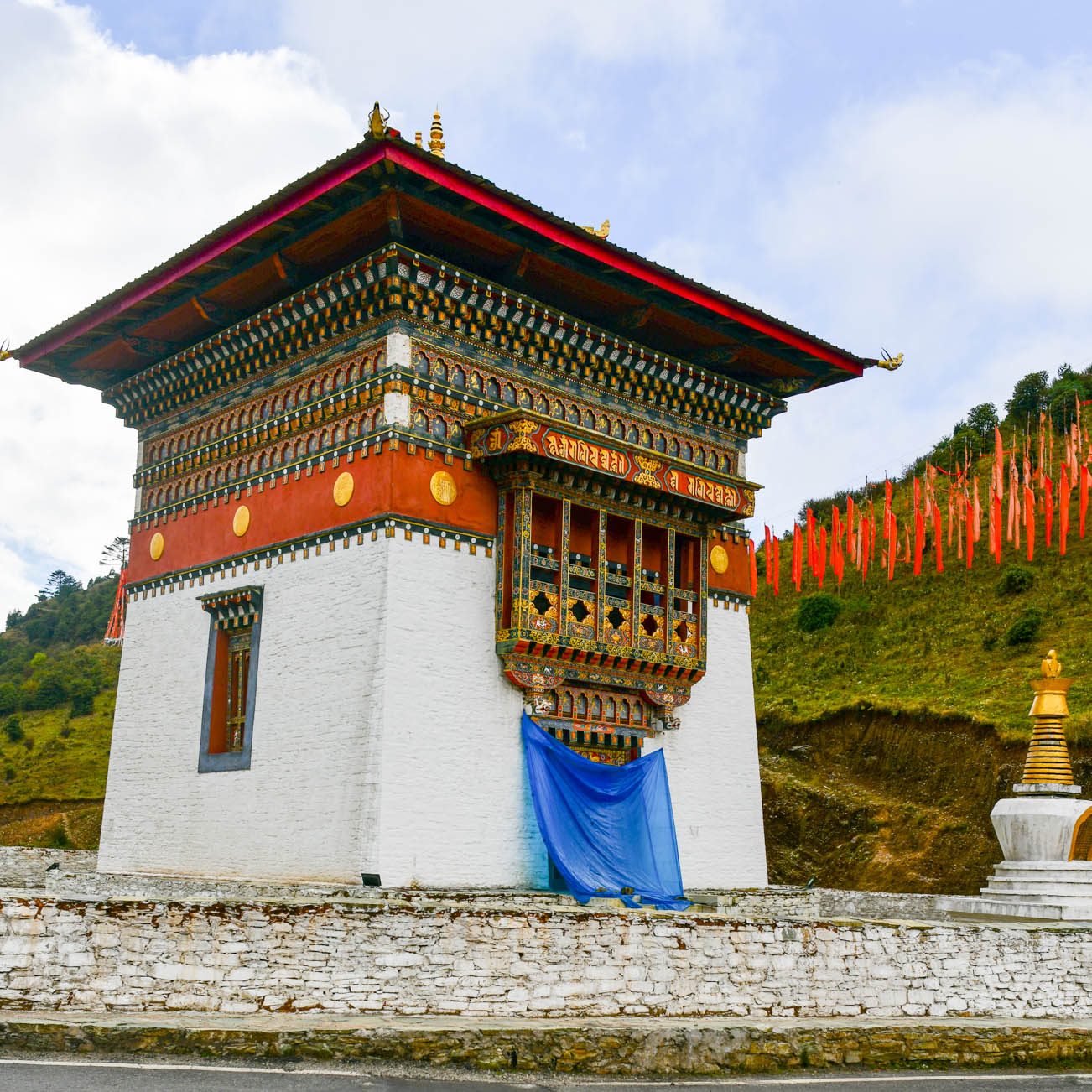
- Pelela Chorten lhakhang, c. October 2021

- Location within Bhutan
- Elevation: 3,420 metres (11,220 ft)

Third Approach
- Range: Himalayas
- Coordinates: 27°32′13″N 90°12′08″E

Pele La (Pele Pass; la means pass in Dzongkha) is a high-mountain motorable pass located in Bhutan.

== Location ==
From Wangdue Phodrang, one can travel east to Pele Pass in Bhutan's central region, which is located at an elevation of 3,420 m (11,220 ft). From its vantage point, on days with clear weather, observers can view Jomolhari soaring at 7,326 m (24,035 ft), Mount Jitchu Drake at 6,662 m (21,857 ft), and Mount Kang Bum standing tall at 6,526 m (21,411 ft).

The pass acts as a demarcation between the western and central regions of the country. Just at the pass, local artisans sell traditional Bhutanese handicrafts and handlooms.

== Gallery ==
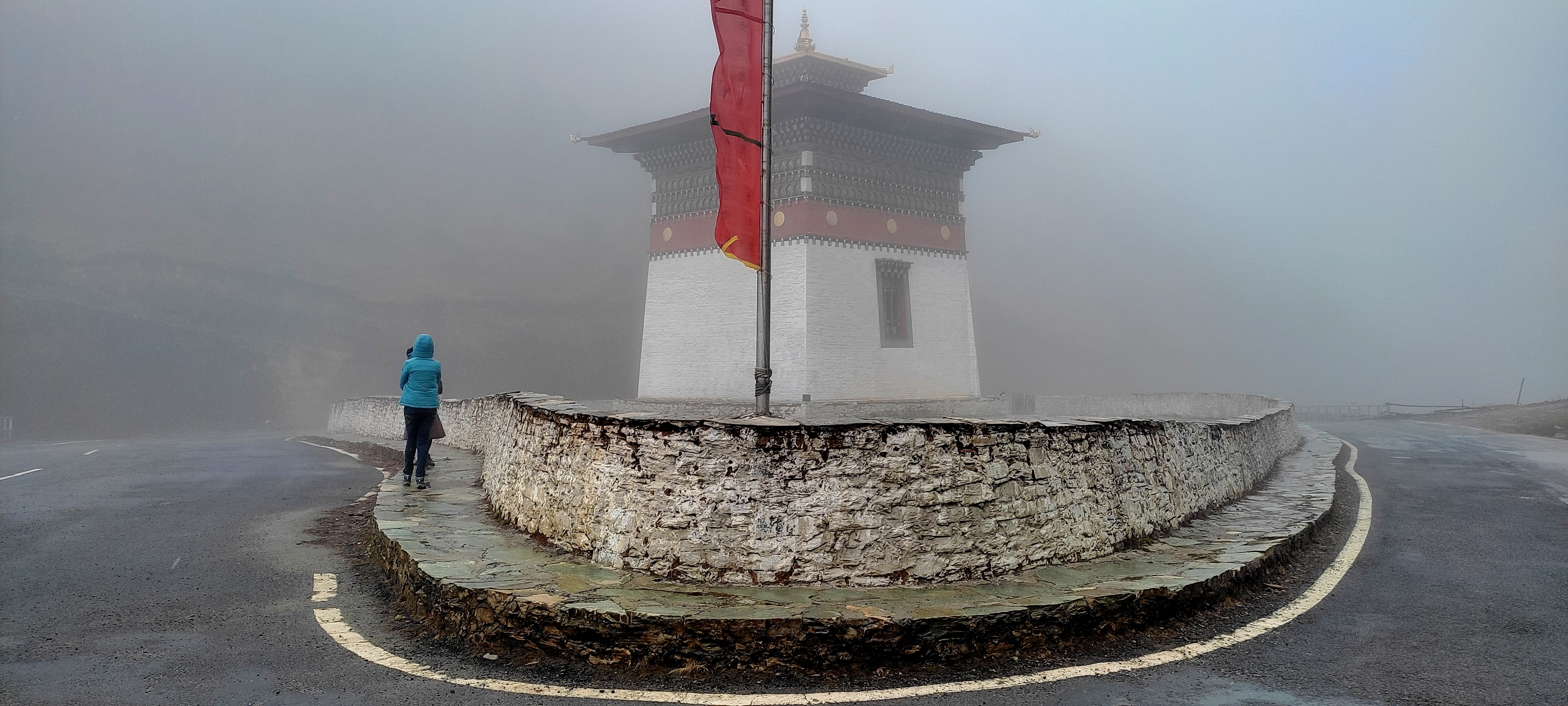
Chorten at Pele La Pass, Central Bhutan, c. March 2023

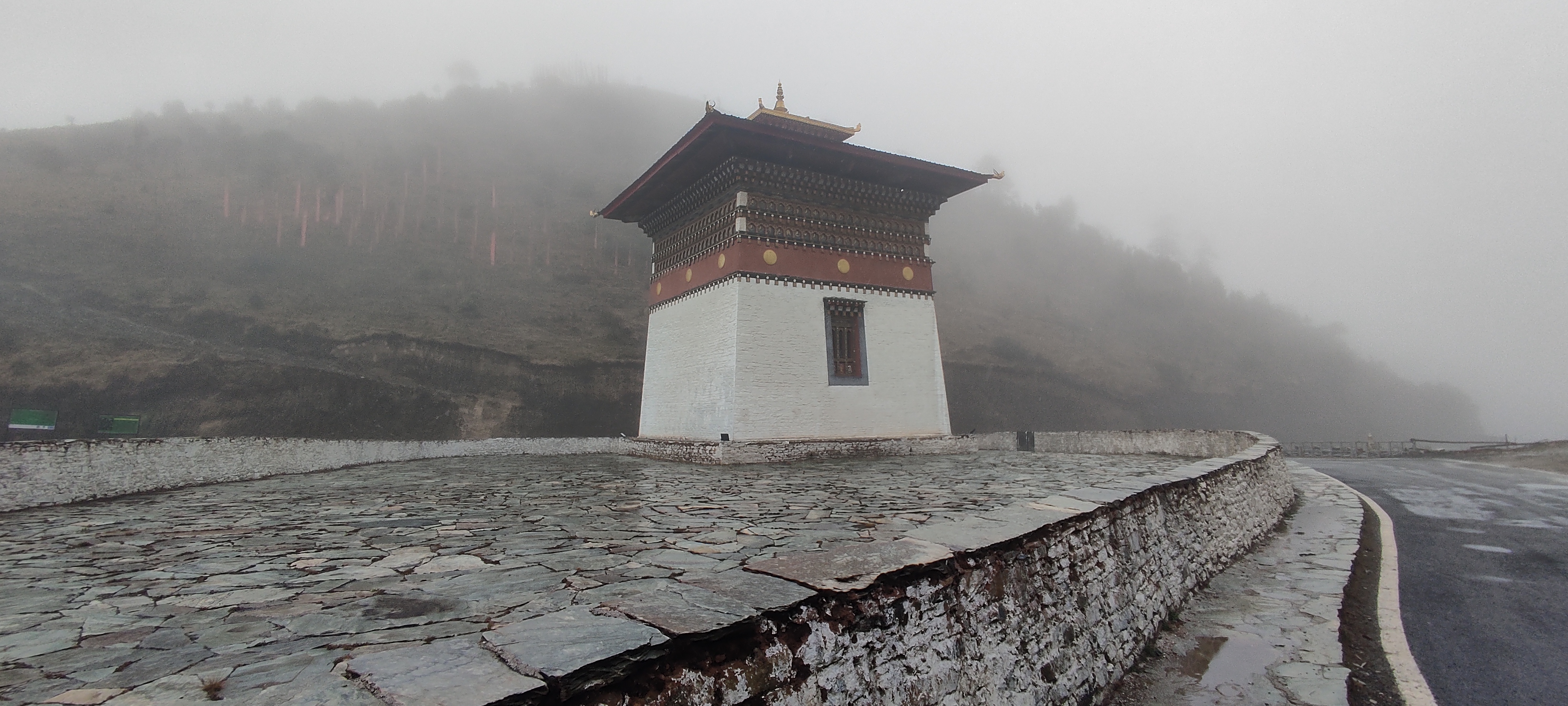
Chorten at Pele La Pass, Central Bhutan, c. March 2023

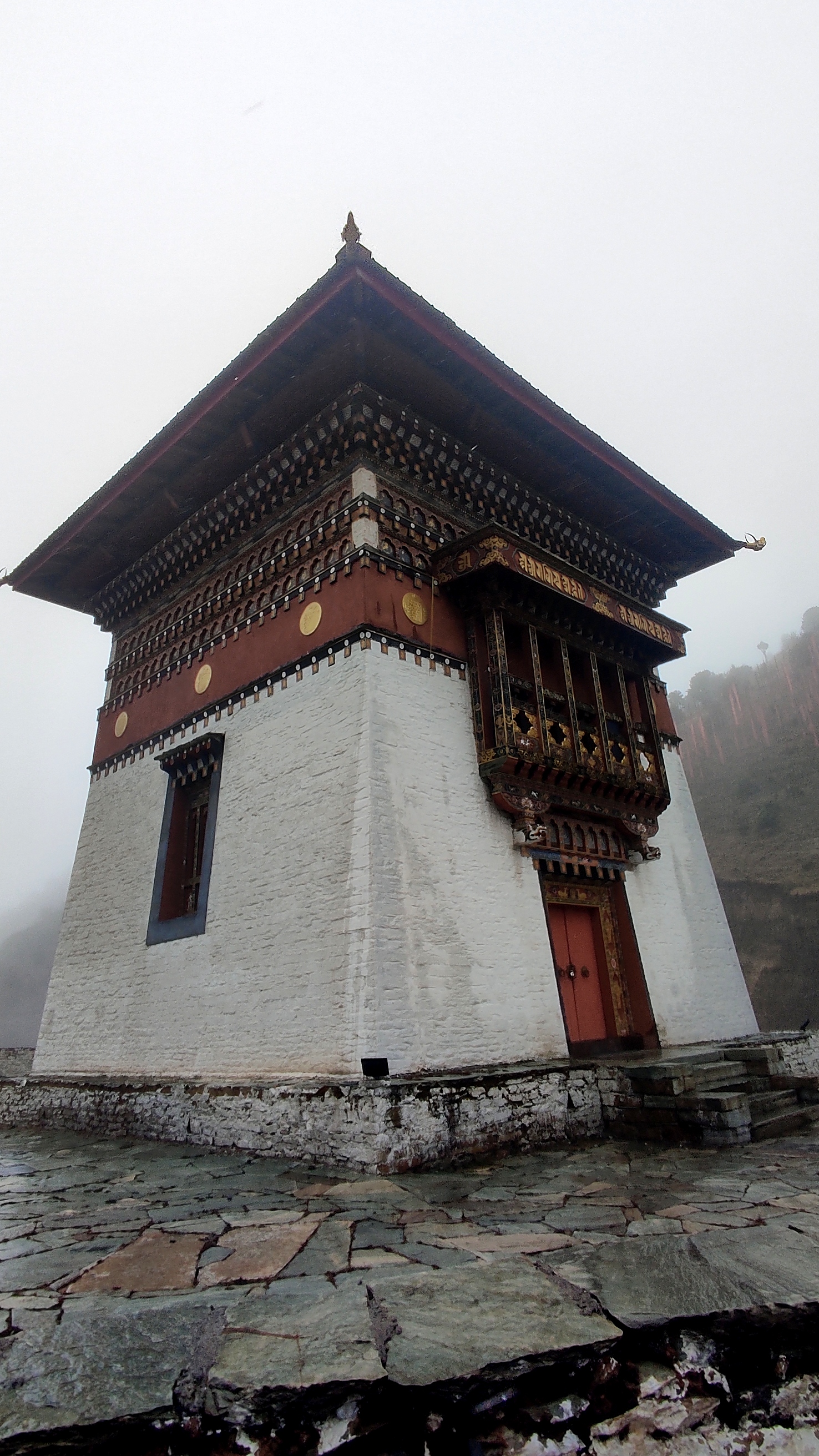
Chorten at Pele La Pass, Central Bhutan, c. March 2023

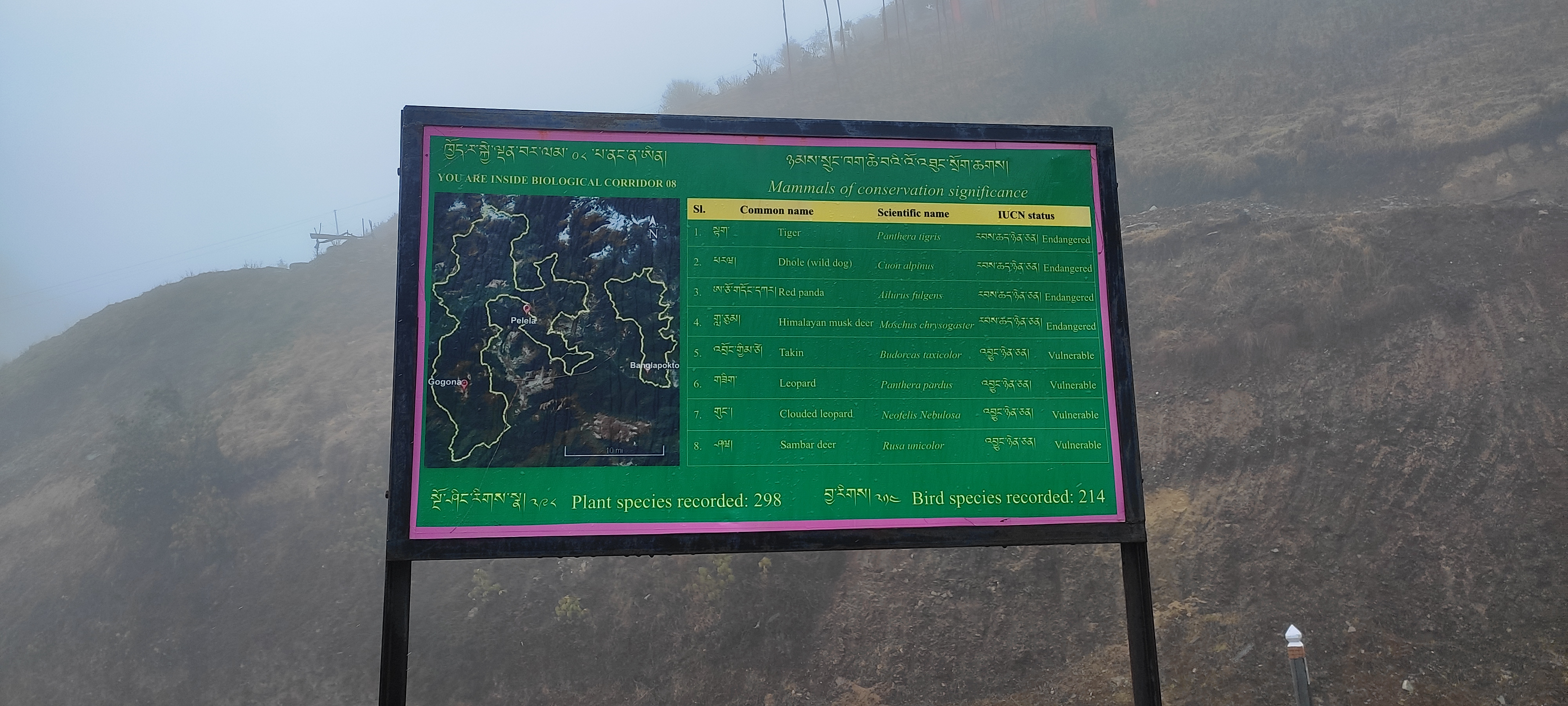
Biological Corridor 08, Pele La Pass, Central Bhutan, c. March 2023

== See also ==
- Trans Bhutan Trail
