= Tserim Kang =

Mountain in Bhutan and China

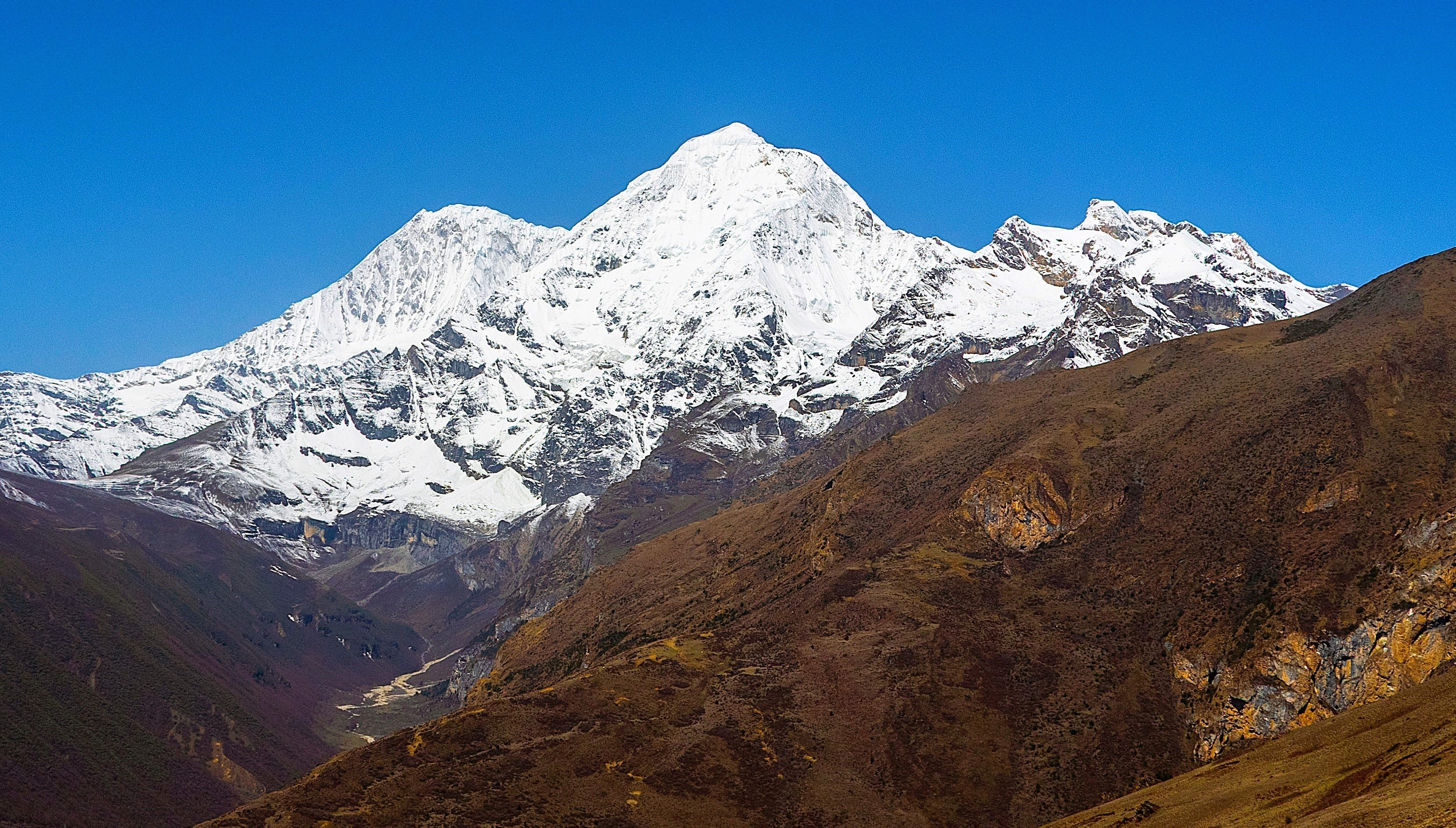
- East aspect, centered

Highest point
- Elevation: 6,532 m (21,430 ft)
- Prominence: 812 m (2,664 ft)
- Parent peak: Jomolhari
- Isolation: 4.34 km (2.70 mi)
- Coordinates: 27°52′20″N 89°22′09″E

Geography
- Location within Bhutan Location within Tibet Location within China
- Interactive map of Tserim Kang
- Location: Bhutan–China border
- Countries: Bhutan and China
- Gewog: Lingzhi Gewog
- District: Thimphu
- Protected area: Jigme Dorji National Park
- Parent range: Himalayas

Tserim Kang is a mountain in Bhutan and Tibet.

== Description ==
Tserim Kang is a 6,532-metre (21,430-foot) glaciated summit in the Himalayas on the Bhutan–China border. It is situated 50 kilometres (31 mi) northwest of Thimphu on the boundary of Jigme Dorji National Park. Precipitation runoff from the mountain's south and east slopes drains into the Mo Chhu drainage basin, whereas the north slope drains to Dochen Tso in Tibet. Topographic relief is significant as the south slope rises 2,030 metres (6,660 ft) in two kilometres (1.2 mi). The nearest higher neighbor is Jichu Drake, four kilometres (2.5 mi) to the southwest. Legend has it that a young girl named Tserim Kang was weaving when Jichu Drake teased her. This upset her and she hit Jitchu Drake on the head with a weaving tool, creating Jichu Drake's double summit. Tserim Kang is also known as Tserim Gang or Takaphu.

== Climate ==
Based on the Köppen climate classification, Tserim Kang is located in a tundra climate zone with cold, snowy winters, and cool summers. Weather systems coming off the Bay of Bengal are forced upwards by the Himalaya mountains (orographic lift), causing heavy precipitation in the form of rainfall and snowfall. June through August is the monsoon season. The months of March, April, May, September, October, and November offer the most favorable weather for viewing this peak.

== See also ==
- Geology of the Himalayas
- List of Himalayan peaks and passes
- Mountains of Bhutan

== Gallery ==
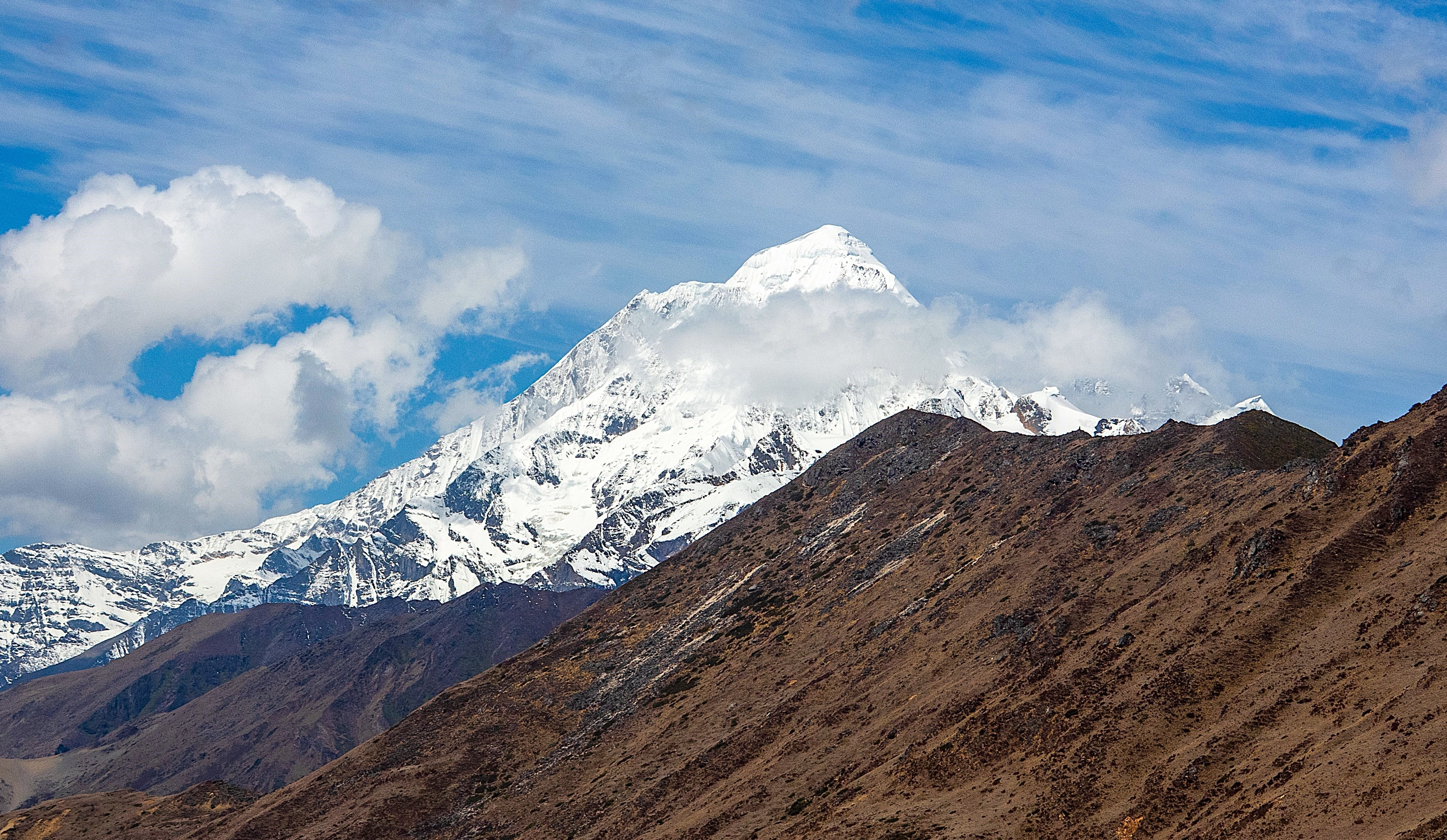
East-northeast aspect
