= Valleys of Bhutan =

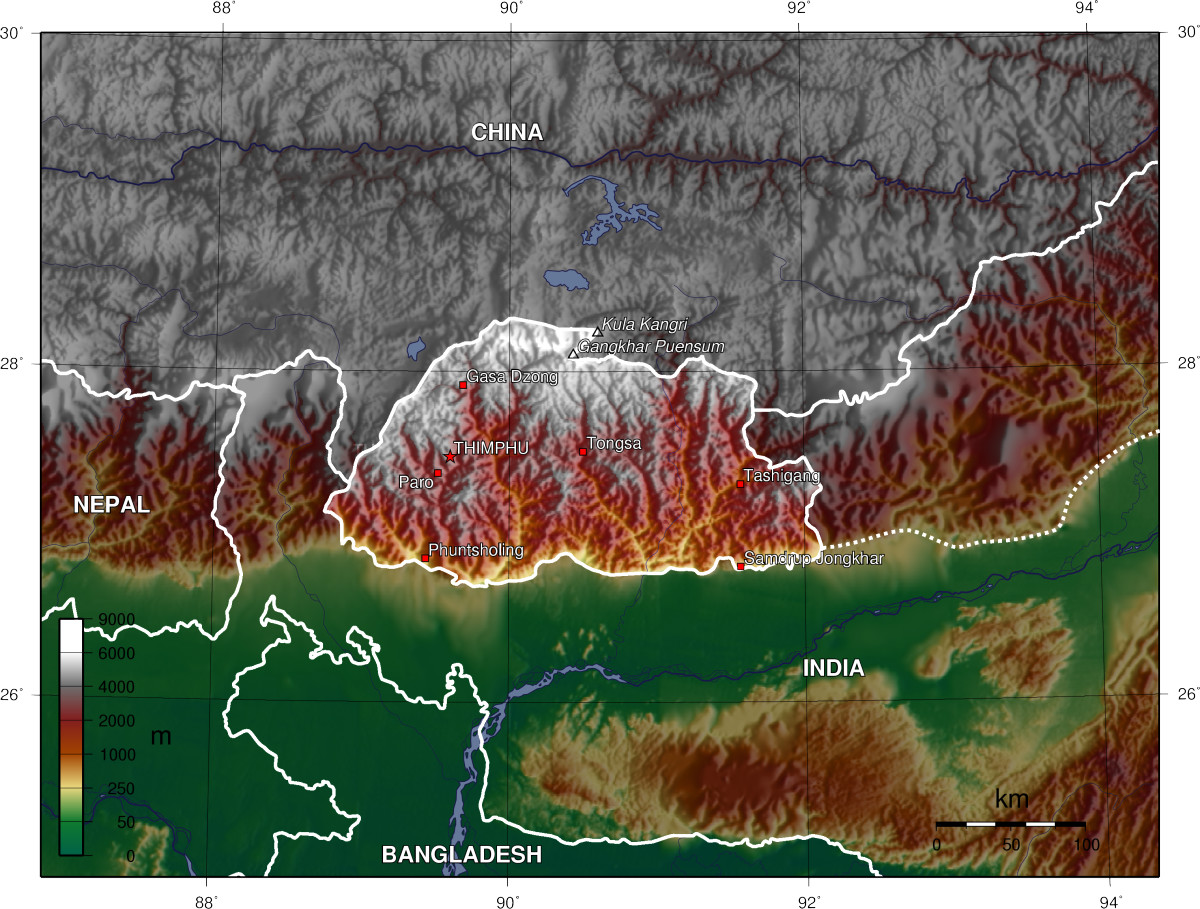
Mountains and valleys dominate the topography of Bhutan.

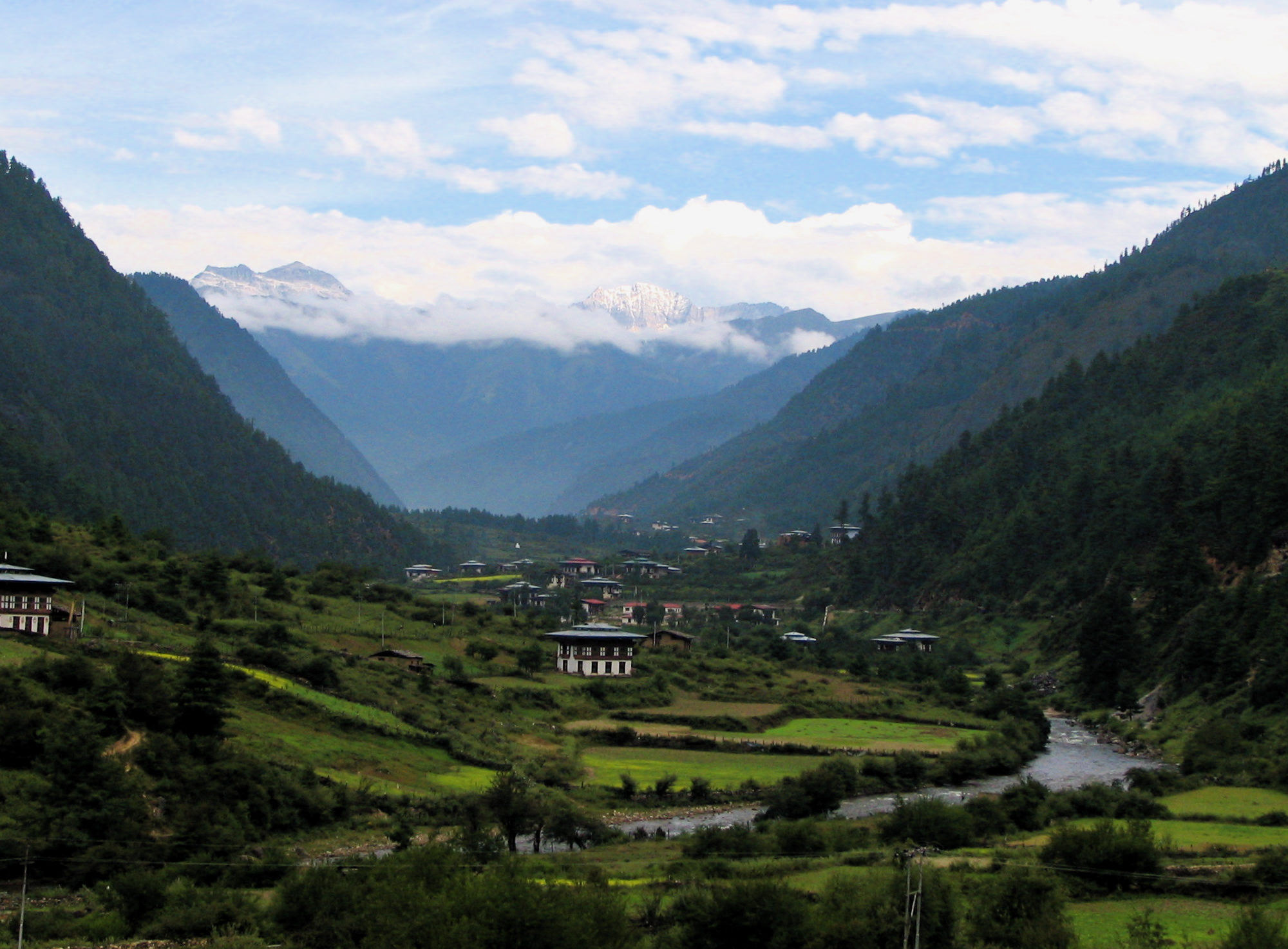
Haa Valley

The valleys of Bhutan are carved into the Himalaya by Bhutan's rivers, fed by glacial melt and monsoon rains. As Bhutan is landlocked in the mountainous eastern Himalaya, much of its population is concentrated in valleys and lowlands, separated by rugged southward spurs of the Inner Himalaya. Despite modernization and development of transport in Bhutan, including a national highway system, travel from one valley to the next remains difficult. Western valleys are bound to the east by the Black Mountains in central Bhutan, which form a watershed between two major river systems, the Mo Chhu (Sankosh River) and the Drangme Chhu. Central valleys are separated from the east by the Donga Range. The more isolated mountain valleys protect several tiny, distinct cultural and linguistic groups. Reflecting this isolation, most valleys have their own local protector deities.

Throughout the history of Bhutan, its valleys and lowlands were the object of political control. During the emergence of Bhutan as an independent state in the 17th century, Shabdrung Ngawang Namgyal conquered the western valleys and constructed dzong fortresses to repel invasions from Tibet. His lieutenant, Penlop of Trongsa, Chogyal Minjur Tempa, went on to conquer the valleys in central and eastern Bhutan for the new theocratic government. As a result, each major valley contains a dzong fortress.

The dry, plain-like valleys of western and central Bhutan tend to be relatively densely populated and intensely cultivated. The wetter eastern valleys, however, tend to be steeper, narrower ravines, with isolated settlements dug directly into mountainsides. In the western regions, valleys produce barley, potatoes, and dairy in the north, while southern reaches produce bananas, oranges, and rice.

== List of valleys of Bhutan ==
Below is a list of the valleys of Bhutan:

B

- Bumdeling Valley, in Lhuntse, Mongar, and Trashiyangtse Districts
- Bumthang Valley, in Bumthang District

C

- Choekhor Valley
- Chumbi Valley, China border
- Chungdu Valley, in Haa District

G

- Gangtey Valley, in Samtse District
- Gayltsa Valley (Gyatsa), Bumthang District

H

- Haa Valley, in Haa District

J

- Jakar Valley (Byakar), in Bumthang District

L

- Lhuentse Valley, in Lhuntse District

M

- Mongar Valley (Shongar), in Mongar District

P

- Paro Valley, in Paro District
- Phobjika Valley (Gangteng), in Wangdue Phodrang District
- Punakha Valley (Wangdi Punakha), in Punakha and Wangdue Phodrang Districts

S

- Shingkhar Valley, in Zhemgang District

T

- Tang Valley, in Bumthang District
- Thimphu Valley, in Thimphu District
- Trashiyangtse Valley, in Trashiyangtse District
- Trongsa Valley (Choetse), in Trongsa District

U

- Ura Valley, in Bumthang District

Z

- Zhemgang Valley, in Zhemgang District

== See also ==
- Mountains of Bhutan
