= Kangphu Kang =

Mountain in the Himalayas, on the border between Tibet and Bhutan

- Shimokangri
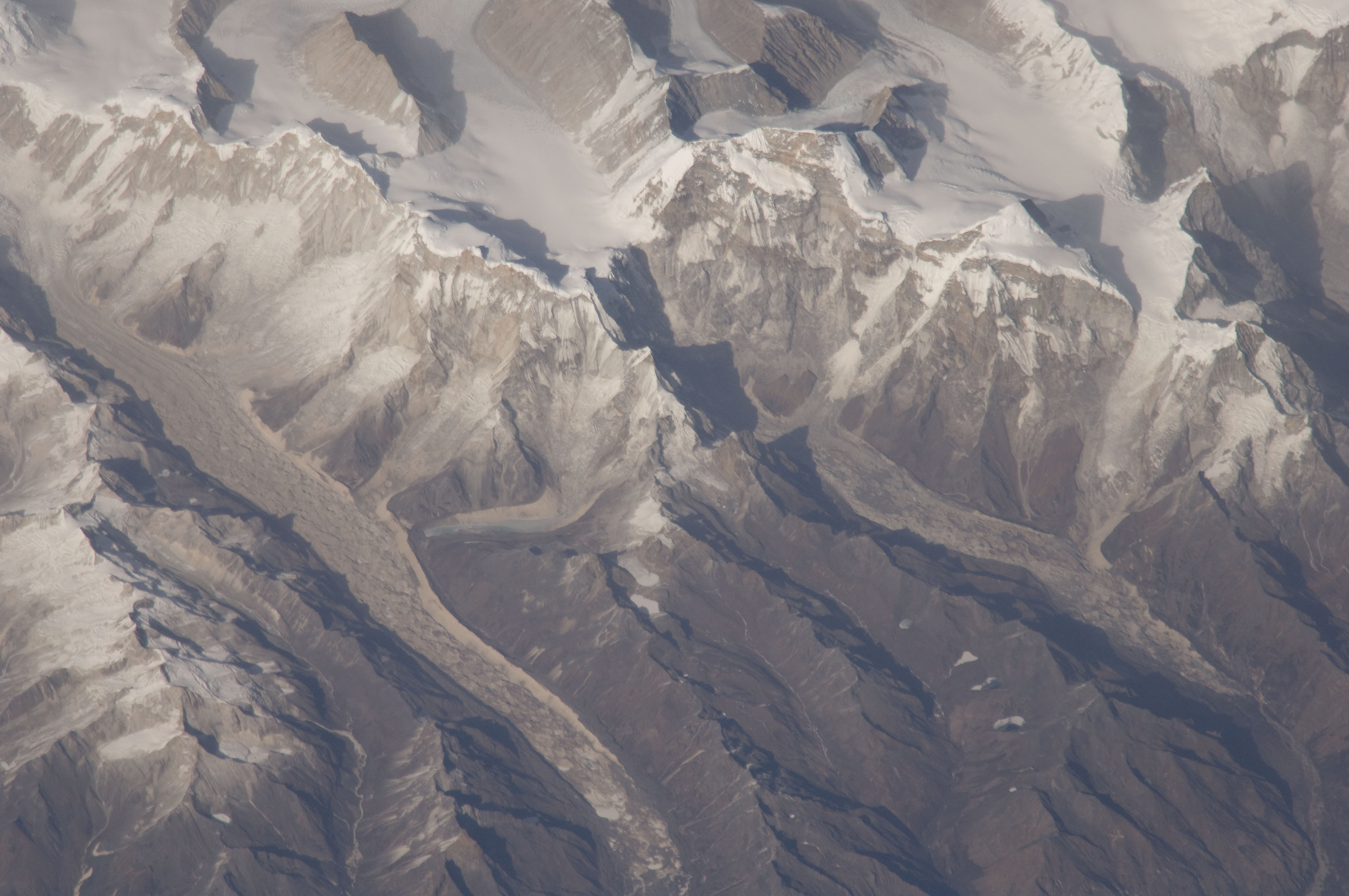
- Kangphu Kang summits and Jejekangphu Kang

Highest point
- Elevation: 7,204 m (23,635 ft); Ranked 106th
- Prominence: 1,240 m (4,070 ft)
- Parent peak: Tongshanjiabu
- Listing: Mountains of Bhutan; Mountains of China
- Coordinates: 28°09′24″N 90°04′15″E

Geography
- Location within Bhutan Location within China
- Location: Bhutan–China border
- Parent range: Himalayas

Climbing
- First ascent: 29 September 2002 by a South Korean expedition
- Easiest route: snow/ice climb

Kangphu Kang or Shimokangri is a mountain in the Himalayas. At 7,204 m (23,635 ft) above sea level it is the 107th highest mountain in the world. The peak is located on the border of Bhutan and China (Tibet).

== Location ==
The mountain has a western and eastern summit connected by a high ridge not dipping below 7,000 m. From the lower western summit (28°09′20″N 90°03′48″E, 7,147 m on China's 1:50,000 People Liberation Army map), a 15 km north ridge including a 6,902 m summit branches of the main divide. The main ridge drops steeply from the west peak to a 6,040 m pass, separating it from Jejekangphu Kang (6,965 m; 28°08′43″N 90°01′24″E). On the other side, the main ridge drops southeast from the east peak to a 6,220 m pass leading to Kangphu Kang II or Dop Kang (6,945 m; 28°08′30″N 90°06′03″E).

== Climbing history ==
Kangphu Kang was first climbed over the north-face on 29 September 2002 by a South Korean expedition.
