= Masang Kang =

Mountain peak in Bhutan

- Masa Gang
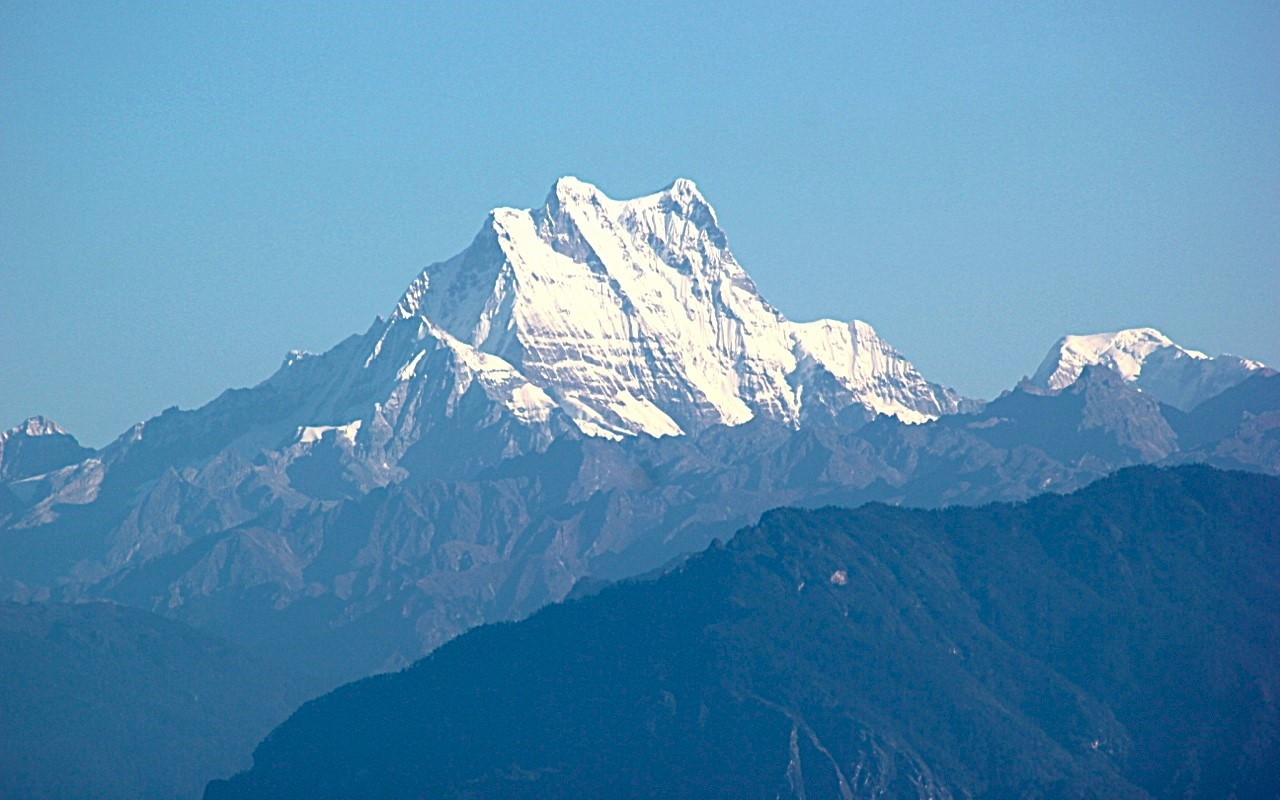
- South aspect

Highest point
- Elevation: 7,194 m (23,602 ft)
- Coordinates: 28°10′09.56″N 89°45′57.46″E

Geography
- Location within Bhutan
- Country: Bhutan
- Parent range: Himalayas

Climbing
- First ascent: 1985, by a Japanese team

Masang Kang (also known as Masa Gang) is a mountain peak located at 7,194 m (23,602 ft) in northern Bhutan.

== Location ==
The mountain peak is located in the catchment area of the Mo Chhu in Jigme Dorji National Park. The peak is 1.3 km south of the main Himalayan ridge, where the border between Bhutan and China runs. In its southeast, at 11.5 km Tsenda Kang 6,481 m (21,263 ft) rises and in its further east, at 18.75 km Tongshanjiabu 7,207 m (23,645 ft) is located. At the base, there is a trunk glacier that is two km in length and fed by multiple tributaries.

According to SIMS data, area surrounding Masang Kang includes mafic granulites and amphibolites, a part of the Great Himalayan complex of crystalline rock structure.

== First ascent ==
In 1985, a Japanese climbers' team from the Kyoto University Alpine Club made the first ascent. The team was split into three groups. The first one consisted of Goro Hitomi, Toshihiro Tsukihara, Kotaro Yokoyama and Shigeki Nakayama - they reached the summit on October 13, 1985. The ascent led from the northeast spur of the mountain. The second group consisted of Kozo Matsubayashi, Hironori Ito, Shinya Takeda, and Masanaru Takai - they reached the summit on the next day i.e., October 14 and finally, on October 15 the third group Yasuhiko Kamizono, Hironori Ito, Koichi Nanno, and Tadao Okada reached the summit.
