= Teri Kang =

Mountain in Bhutan

- Location within Bhutan

Highest point
- Elevation: 7,125 m (23,376 ft)
- Prominence: 484 m (1,588 ft)
- Listing: Mountains of Bhutan
- Coordinates: 28°10′19″N 89°56′32″E

Geography
- Country: Bhutan

Climbing
- First ascent: Unclimbed

Teri Kang is a 7,125-metre (23,376 ft) mountain peak located in northern Bhutan.

== Location ==
Due to the low prominence of 464 m, Teri Kang is considered as a sub-peak of Tongshanjiabu, not an independent mountain. The north and south flanks of the peak are drained via the West Pho Chhu.

== Climbing history ==
According to the Himalayan Index, no expedition has officially climbed Teri Kang yet.
