= Mount Jitchu Drake =

Bhutanese mountain

Jichu Drake
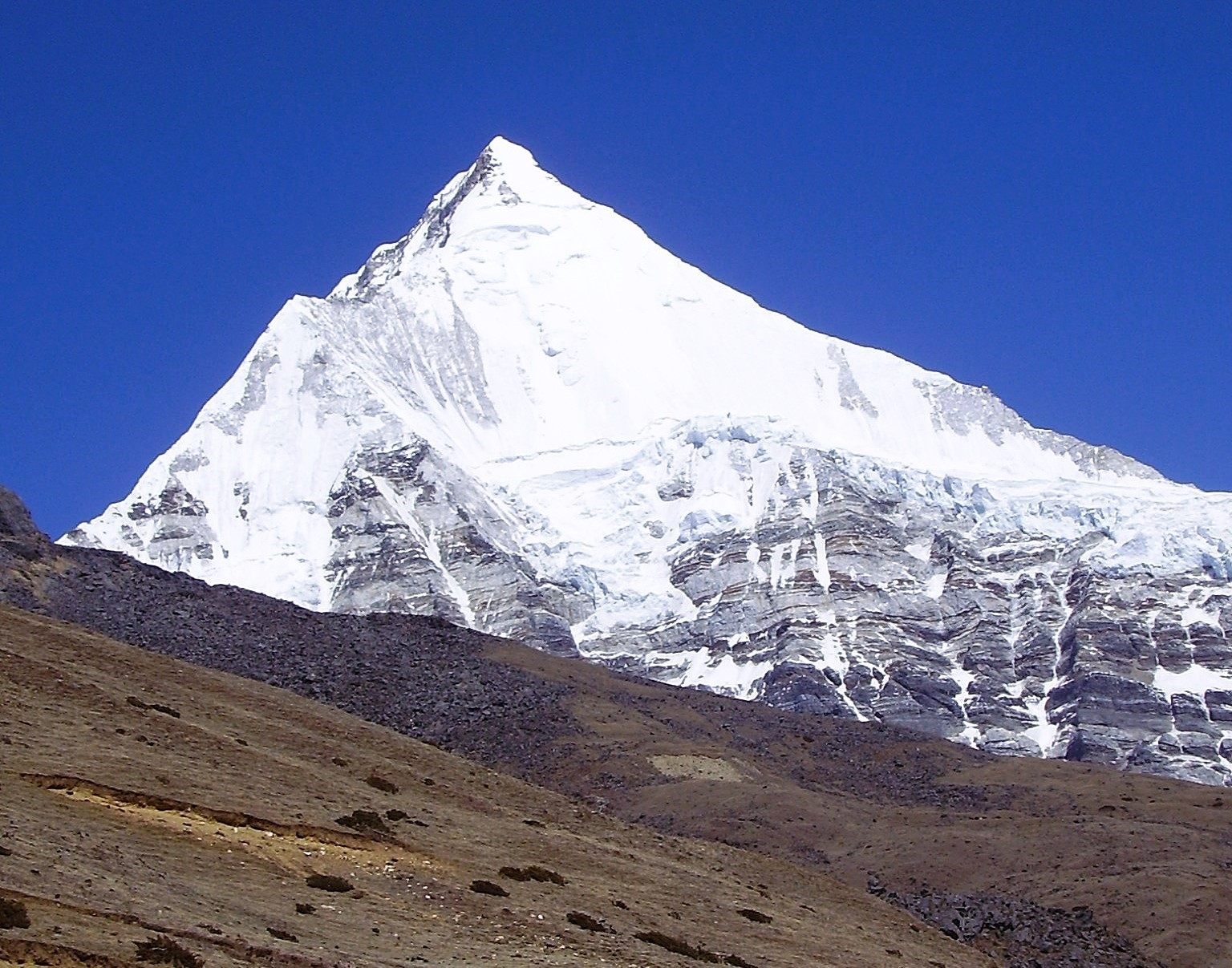
- South aspect

Highest point
- Elevation: 6,662 metres (21,857 ft)
- Coordinates: 27°51′0″N 89°19′0″E

Naming
- English translation: angry bird

Geography
- Location within Bhutan
- Parent range: Himalaya

Climbing
- First ascent: May 1988

Jichu Drake (pronounced drah kay) is a mountain in Bhutan among the Himalayas, and a companion peak to Mount Jomolhari. Its height is given variously as 6714m, 6789m, 6797m, 6970m or 6989m by various sources. Jitchu Drake has a double summit, with the lower summit to the south.

Jitchu Drakye is the Tutelary deity of Paro and its environs. It is also known as Kungphu or Ts(h)erim Kang, Shumkang, Jichi Dak Keth (meaning ‘sparrow rock sound’), Tseringegang or Tsheringme Gang (snows of the goddess of long life.

A local story is that the double peak originated because Jitch Drake teased a young girl while she was weaving, resulting in her hitting Jitchu Drake on the head with the tham (the piece of wood used to beat a new line of weft weaved), producing the double peak.

Latest edition: Bart Jordans - Trekking in Bhutan 2018 Cicerone Press

== Climbing history ==
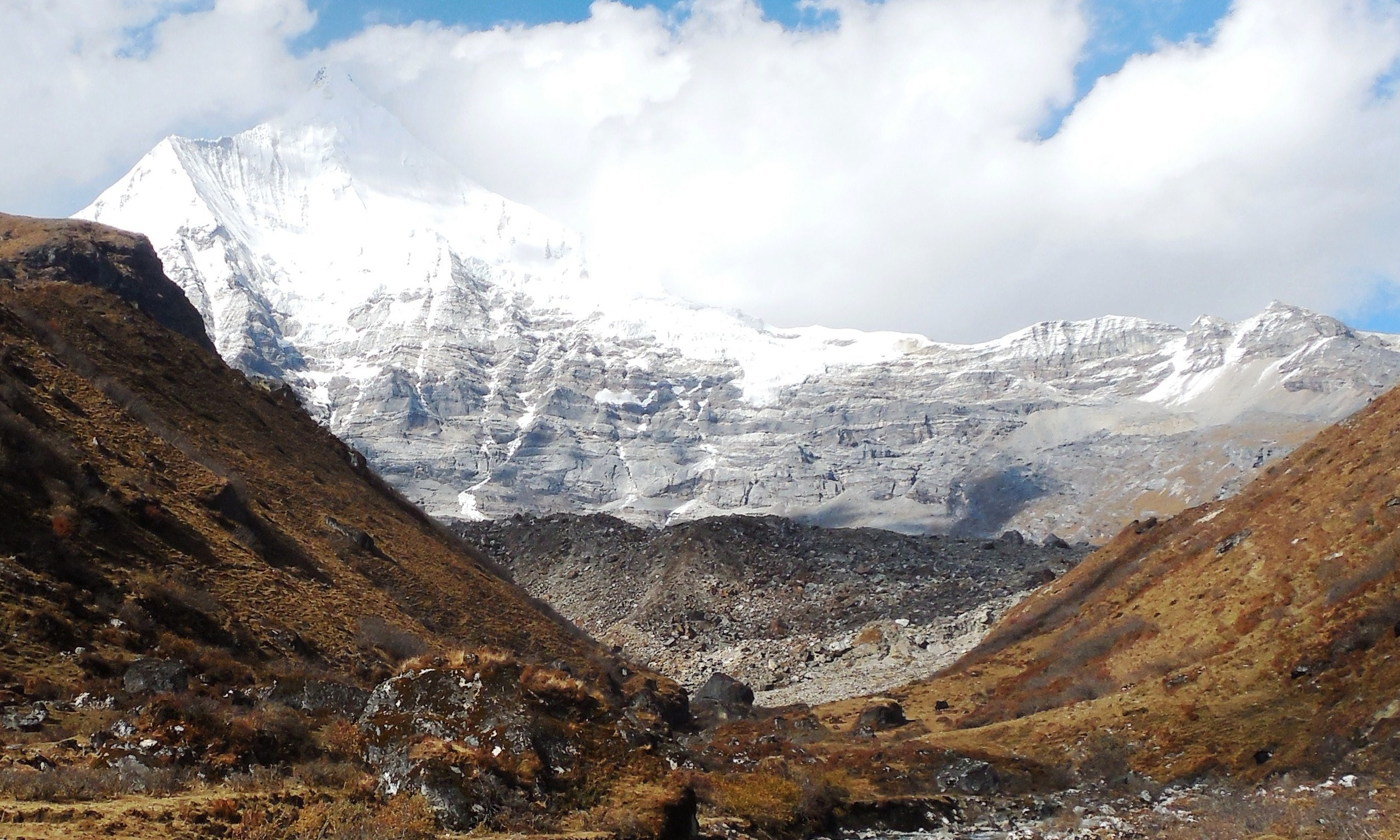
Jitchu Drakye from bridge above Jangothang

The south summit was first climbed by the Austrian expedition of Werner Sucher, Albert Egger, Alois Stuckler, Sepp Mayerl and Toni Ponholzer in May 1983. The first ascent of the higher North summit was in May 1988 by Sharu Prabhu from India, Doug Scott and Victor Saunders from the UK via the south face.

The Italian climbers Giorgio Corradini and Tiziano Nannuzzi were killed during an attempt on the North summit in 1984.

== See also ==
- Mountains of Bhutan
- Tserim Kang
