= Gangkhar Puensum =

Unclimbed mountain in Bhutan

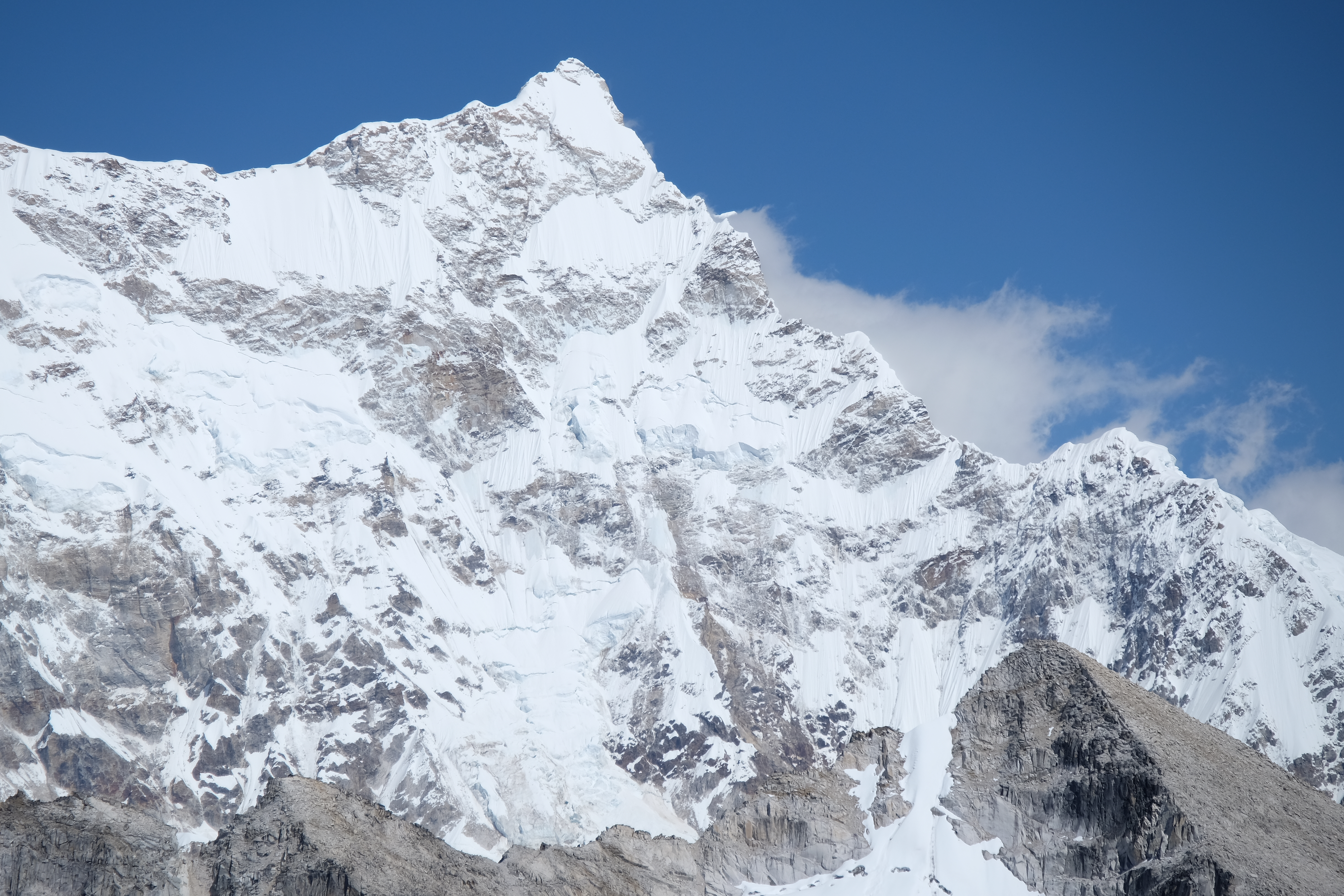
- Summit of Gangkhar Puensum

Highest point
- Elevation: 7,571 m (24,839 ft); Ranked 40th
- Prominence: 2,995 m (9,826 ft); Ranked 92nd
- Listing: Country high point Ultra
- Coordinates: 28°02′54″N 90°27′15″E

Naming
- Native name: གངས་དཀར་སྤུན་གསུམ་ (Dzongkha)

Geography
- Location within Bhutan
- The major peaks (not mountains) above 7,500 m (24,600 ft) height in Himalayas, rank identified in Himalayas alone (not the world). Legend: 1：Mount Everest; 2：Kangchenjunga; 3：Lhotse; 4：Yalung Kang, Kanchenjunga West; 5：Makalu; 6：Kangchenjunga South; 7：Kangchenjunga Central; 8：Cho Oyu; 9：Dhaulagiri; 10：Manaslu (Kutang); 11：Nanga Parbat (Diamer); 12：Annapurna; 13：Shishapangma (Shishasbangma, Xixiabangma); 14：Manaslu East; 15：Annapurna East Peak; 16： Gyachung Kang; 17：Annapurna II; 18：Tenzing Peak (Ngojumba Kang, Ngozumpa Kang, Ngojumba Ri); 19：Kangbachen; 20：Himalchuli (Himal Chuli); 21：Ngadi Chuli (Peak 29, Dakura, Dakum, Dunapurna); 22：Nuptse (Nubtse); 23：Nanda Devi; 24：Chomo Lonzo (Chomolonzo, Chomolönzo, Chomo Lönzo, Jomolönzo, Lhamalangcho); 25：Namcha Barwa (Namchabarwa); 26：Zemu Kang (Zemu Gap Peak); 27：Kamet; 28：Dhaulagiri II; 29：Ngojumba Kang II; 30：Dhaulagiri III; 31：Kumbhakarna Mountain (Mount Kumbhakarna, Jannu); 32：Gurla Mandhata (Naimona'nyi, Namu Nan); 33：Hillary Peak (Ngojumba Kang III); 34：Molamenqing (Phola Gangchen); 35：Dhaulagiri IV; 36：Annapurna Fang; 37：Silver Crag; 38：Kangbachen Southwest; 39：Gangkhar Puensum (Gangkar Punsum); 40：Annapurna III; 41：Himalchuli West; 42：Annapurna IV; 43：Kula Kangri; 44：Liankang Kangri (Gangkhar Puensum North, Liangkang Kangri); 45：Ngadi Chuli South; Location of Gangkhar Puensum
- Location: Bhutan–China border
- Parent range: Himalaya

Climbing
- First ascent: Unclimbed

Gangkhar Puensum (Dzongkha: གངས་དཀར་སྤུན་གསུམ་, romanized: Kangkar Punsum, alternatively, Gangkar Punsum or Gankar Punzum) is the highest mountain in Bhutan and the highest unclimbed mountain in the world, with an elevation of 7,570 metres (24,836 ft) and a prominence of 2,995 metres (9,826 ft). In the Dzongkha language, its name means "White Peak of the Three Spiritual Brothers".

Gangkhar Puensum lies on the border between Bhutan and Tibet. After Bhutan was opened for mountaineering in 1983, there were four expeditions that resulted in failed summit attempts in 1985 and 1986.

In 1994, Bhutan banned the climbing of peaks over 6,000 metres (20,000 ft) and since 2003, all mountaineering has been banned in Bhutan.

== History ==
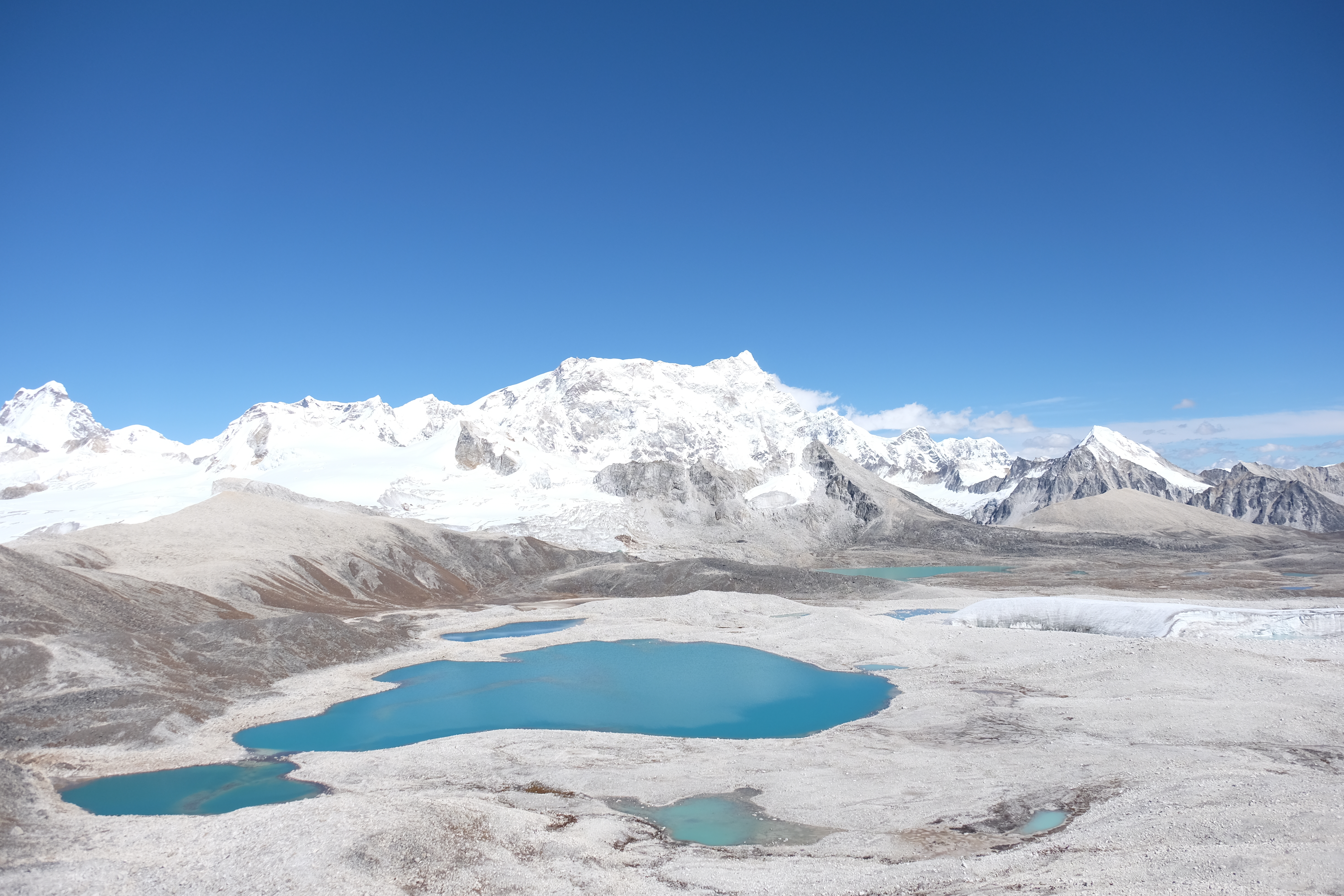
The mountain seen from Gophu La pass

The elevation of Gangkhar Puensum was first measured in 1922, but until recent years, maps of the region were not at all accurate and the mountain was shown in different locations and with markedly different heights. Indeed, because of inadequate mapping, the first team to attempt the summit was unable to find the mountain at all.

The book of the 1986 British expedition gives the mountain's height as 7,550 metres (24,770 ft) and states that Gangkhar Puensum is completely inside Bhutan, whereas the nearby Kula Kangri is completely inside Tibet. Kula Kangri, 7,554 metres (24,783 ft), is a separate mountain 30 km (20 mi) to the northeast which was first climbed in 1986. It is variously mapped and described as being in Tibet or Bhutan.

Since 1994, climbing of mountains in Bhutan above 6,000 m (20,000 ft) has been prohibited out of respect for local spiritual beliefs. Since 2003, mountaineering has been forbidden completely.

In 1998, a Japanese expedition secured permission from the Chinese Mountaineering Association to climb the mountain, but permission was withdrawn because of a political issue with Bhutan. This resulted in their permit to climb Gangkhar Puensum itself being revoked. Instead, in 1999, the team set off from Tibet and successfully climbed Liankang Kangri (also known as Gangkhar Puensum North), a 7,534 metres (24,718 ft) subsidiary peak (not an independent mountain), separated from the main peak by a 2-kilometre (1.2 mi) ridge to the north-northwest.

Unlike many maps, the expedition's report shows this summit as being in Tibet and the Bhutan–China border is shown crossing the summit of Gangkhar Puensum, described as "the highest peak in Bhutan", at 7,570 metres (24,840 ft).

== See also ==
- Mountains of Bhutan
- List of elevation extremes by country
- List of ultras of the Himalayas
