= Black Mountains (Bhutan) =

Mountain range in Bhutan

Coordinates: 27°17′N 90°23′E

The Black Mountains is a mountain range in central Bhutan, a sub−range of the Himalayan Range System. Locally the mountain range is known as Dungshing Gang which means the fir peaks.

== Geography ==
Durshingla Peak, at an elevation of 15,145 feet (4,616 m), is the range's highest point.

== National Park ==
Jigme Singye Wangchuck National Park protects a large area of the Black Mountains and the Eastern Himalayan broadleaf forests ecoregion within them. It was originally named Black Mountains National Park.

== Alpine lakes ==
The black mountains range is home to some of the beautiful alpine lakes which are the source of some rivers. The lakes are:

- Gesatsho
- Tshonamtsho
- Broksatsho
- Mendatsho
- Peptatsho
- Bekhotsho
- Tshobobzhao
- Sertsho
- Yutsho

== See also ==
- Mountains of Bhutan
- Mountain ranges of Bhutan
- Mountain ranges of the Himalayas
