= Great Himalayas =

Higher mountain range of the Himalayas

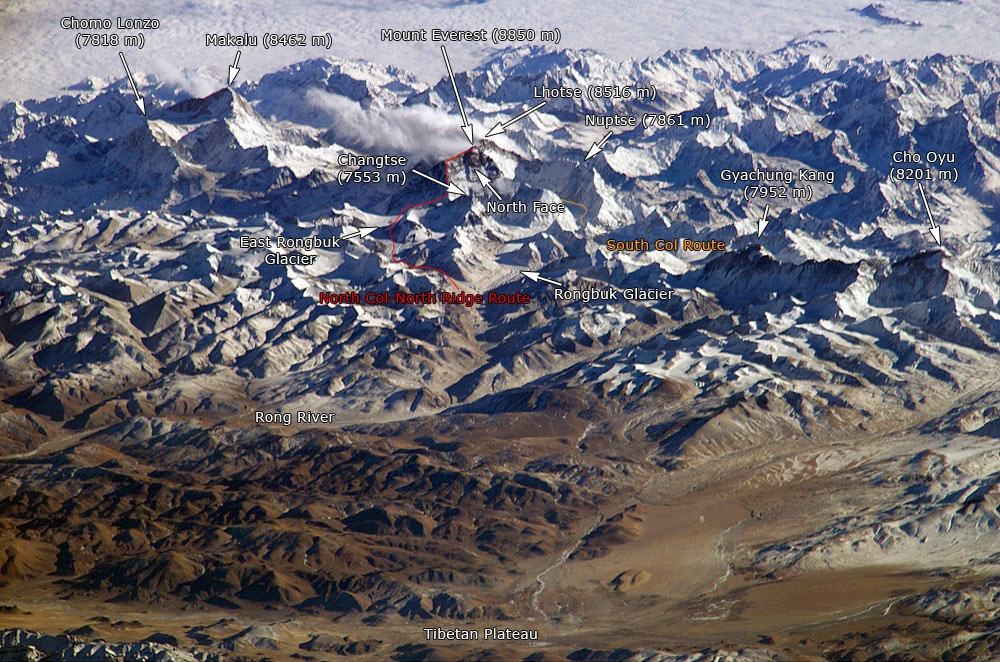
Part of the Great Himalayas showing the eight-thousanders

The Great Himalayas (also known as Greater Himalayas, Inner Himalayas, or Himadri) is one of the four parallel sub-ranges of the Himalayas. The core of this part of the Himalayas is composed of granite. It is perennially snowbound. It is the highest in altitude and extends for about 2,300 km (1,400 mi) from northern Pakistan to the Indian state of Arunachal Pradesh, passing through China, India, Nepal, and Bhutan. The sub-range has an average elevation of 6,100 m (20,000 ft) and contains many of the world's tallest peaks, including the eight-thousanders and Mount Everest, the highest peak on Earth. The range is mainly composed of granite rocks with permafrost, and consists of many glaciers, including the Gangotri, Khumbu, and Satopanth Glaciers.

== See also ==
- Geology of the Himalaya
- Mountain ranges of the Himalayas
