= Tongshanjiabu =

Mountain shared by Bhutan and People's Republic of China

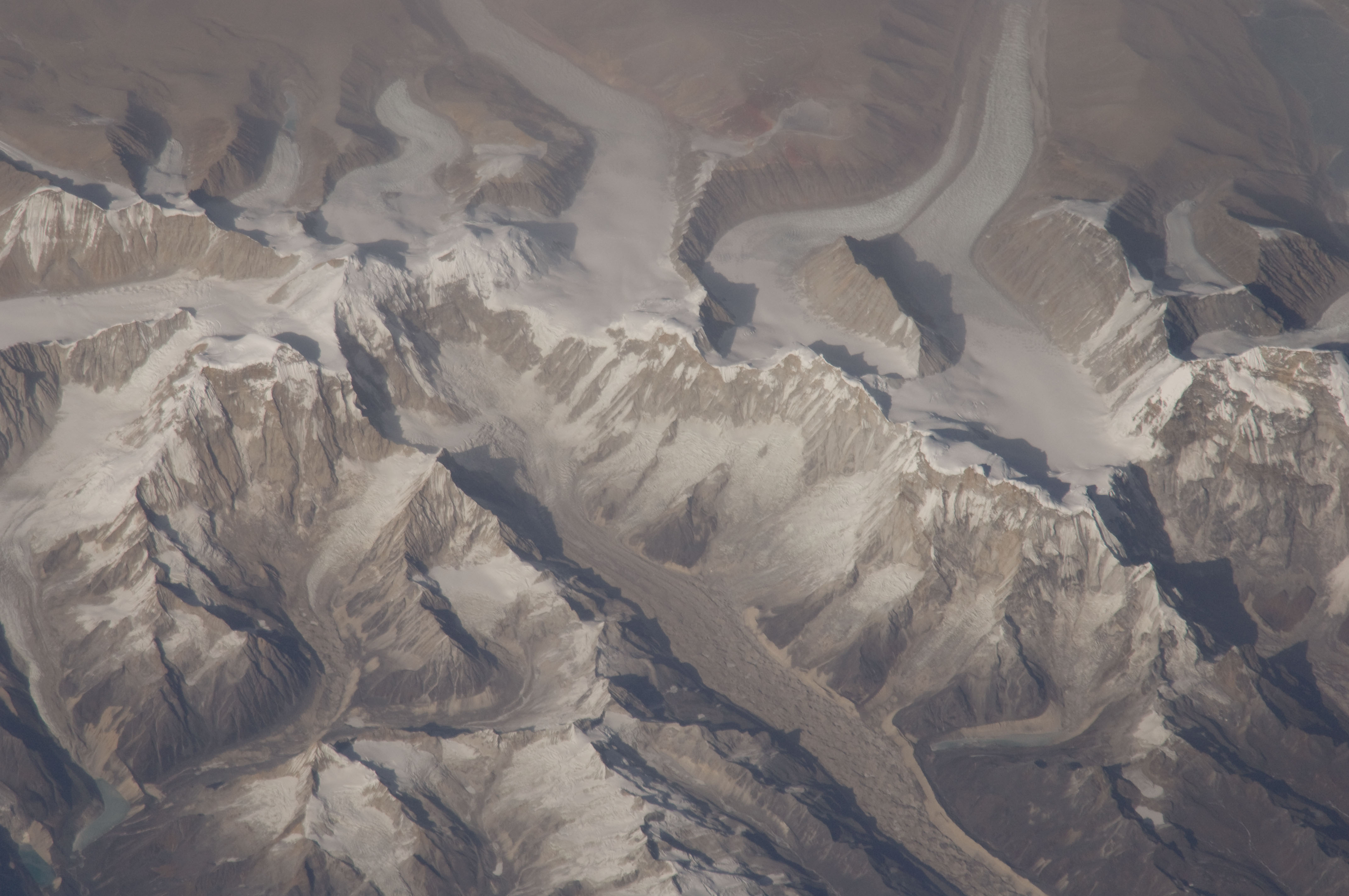
- Tongshanjiabu summits and Jejekangphu Kang

Highest point
- Elevation: 7,207 m (23,645 ft); Ranked 102nd
- Prominence: 1,757 m (5,764 ft)
- Listing: Ultra
- Coordinates: 28°11′12″N 89°57′27″E

Geography
- Location within Bhutan
- Location: Bhutan–China border
- Parent range: Himalayas

Climbing
- First ascent: Unclimbed

Tongshanjiabu
- Chinese: 同山加布峰
Transcriptions
Standard Mandarin
- Hanyu Pinyin: Tóngshānjiābù fēng

Tongshanjiabu, also called Gyalbu Kangri, is a mountain in the Himalayas.

== Location ==
At 7,207 metres (23,645 ft) tall, Tongshanjiabu is the 102nd tallest mountain in the world. It sits in the disputed border territory between Bhutan and China. The name "Tongshanjiabu" is indicated on a map from the Japanese Alpine News, May 2003, p. 44. The region's highpoint is sometimes given as "Teri Kang", but this appears to be the name of a subsidiary top (Teri Kang).

== Climbing history ==
Tongshanjiabu has never been known to be climbed.

== See also ==
- Mountains of Bhutan
- List of ultras of the Himalayas
