= Provinces of Bhutan =

Historical regions of Bhutan governed by aristocrats

Provinces of Bhutan

The Provinces of Bhutan were historical regions of Bhutan headed by penlops and dzongpens (both translated as "governor"). Provincial lords gained power as the increasingly dysfunctional "Dual System of Government" eventually collapsed amid civil war. The victorious Penlop of Trongsa Ugyen Wangchuck gained de jure sovereignty over the entire realm in 1907, marking the establishment of the modern Kingdom of Bhutan and the ascendancy of the House of Wangchuck. Since this time, the provinces of Bhutan have been reorganized several times into what are now the twenty Districts of Bhutan (Dzongkhag). Provincial titles such as Penlop of Trongsa and Penlop of Paro carry on, however, wholly subordinate to the Royal House.

Traditionally, Bhutan comprised nine provinces: Trongsa, Paro, Punakha, Wangdue Phodrang, Daga (also Taka, Tarka, or Taga), Bumthang, Thimphu, Kurtoed (also Kurtoi, Kuru-tod), and Kurmaed (or Kurme, Kuru-mad). The Provinces of Kurtoed and Kurmaed were combined into one local administration, leaving the traditional number of governors at eight. While some lords were Penlops, others held the title Dzongpen (Dzongkha: རྗོང་དཔོན་; Wylie: rjong-dpon; also "Jongpen," "Dzongpön"); both titles may be translated as "governor."

== History ==
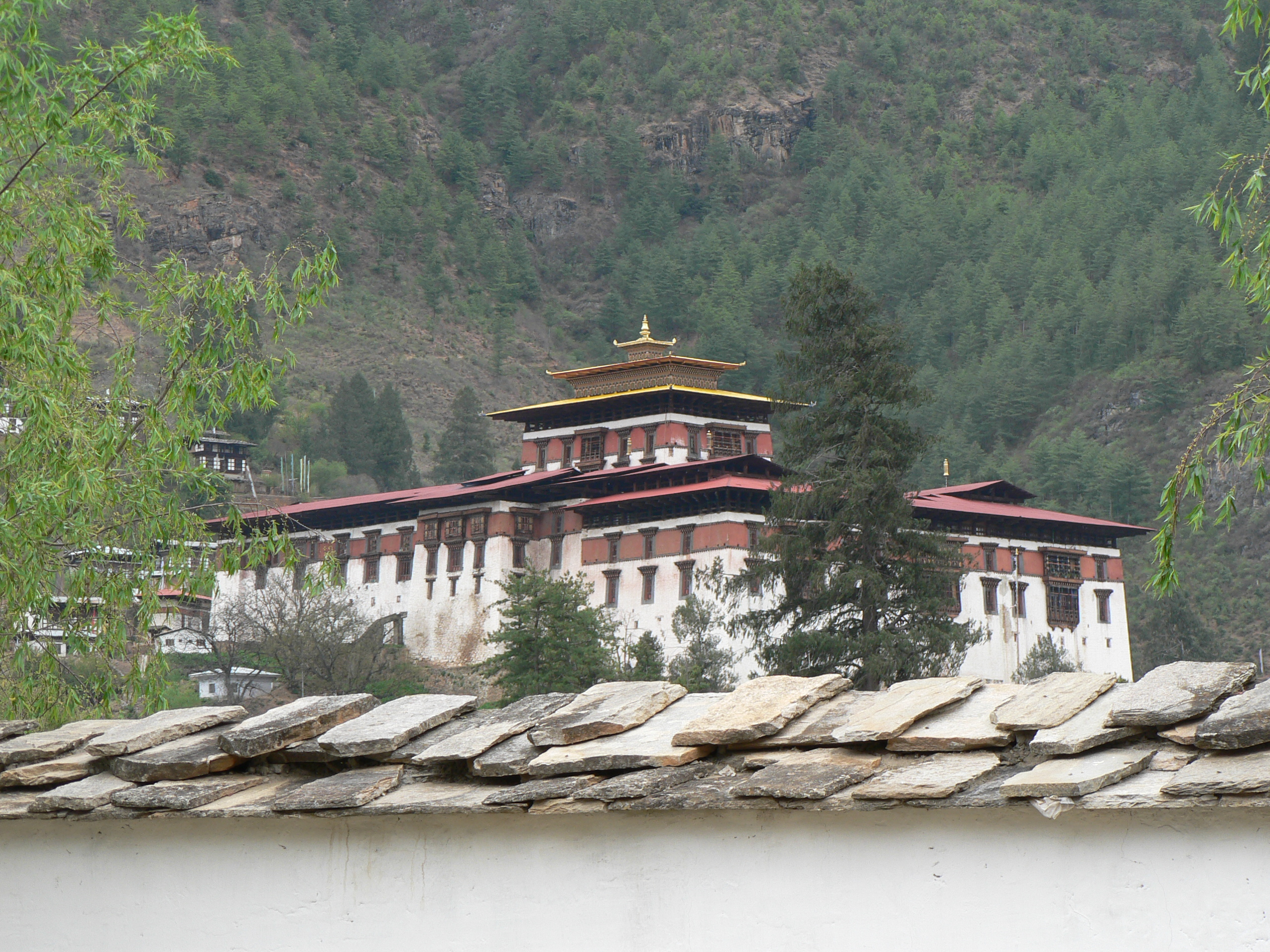
Paro Dzong, administrative headquarters of historical Paro Province

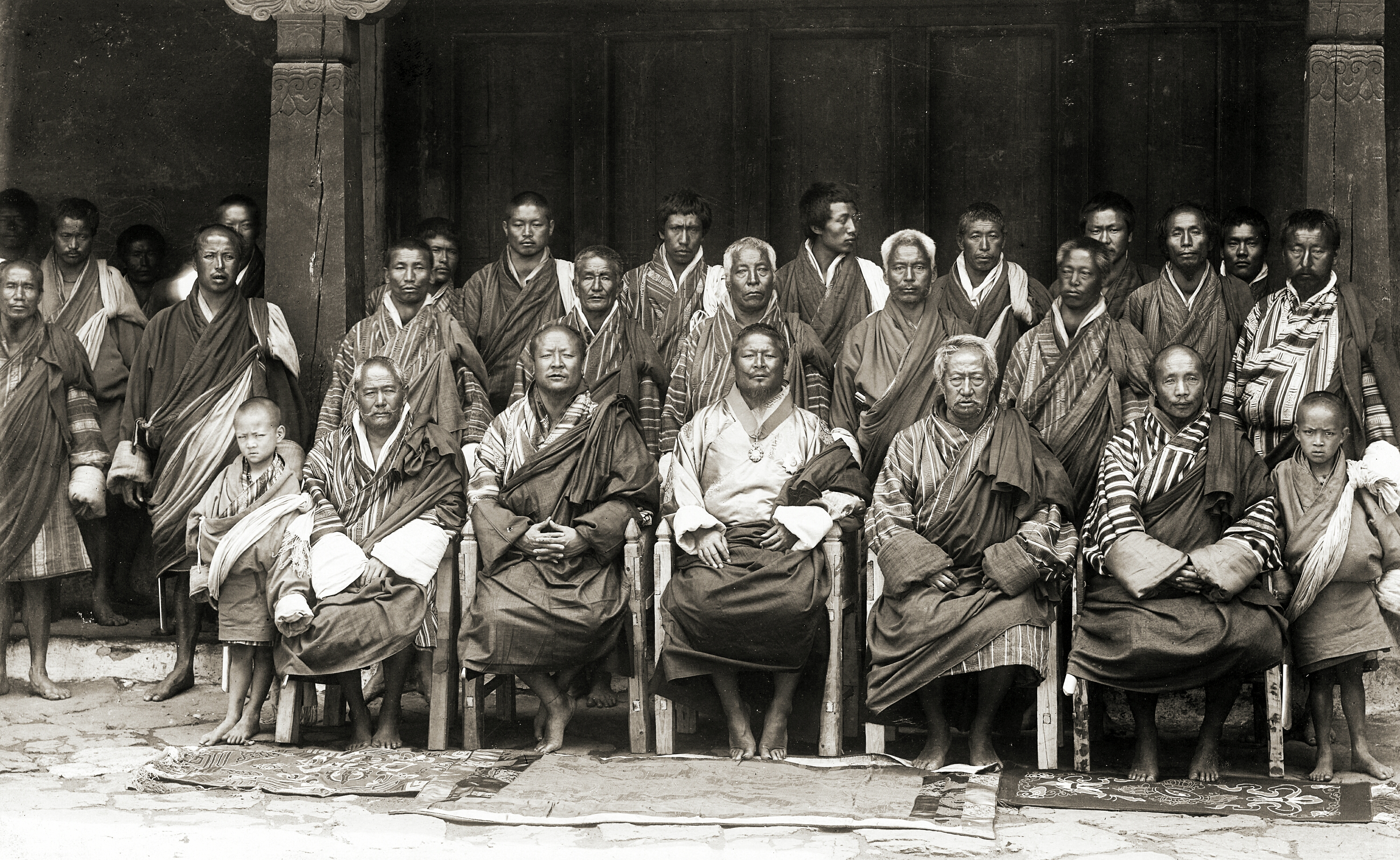
Ugyen Wangchuck surrounded by his councillors at Punakha, Bhutan, 1905. Front Row: son of Thimphu Jongpen, Punakha Jongpen, Thimphu Jongpen, Trongsa Penlop, Zung Donyer [dronyer], Deb Zimpon, and elder son of Thimphu Jongpen.

Under Bhutan's early theocratic dual system of government, decreasingly effective central government control resulted in the de facto disintegration of the office of Shabdrung after the death of Shabdrung Ngawang Namgyal in 1651. Under this system, the Shabdrung reigned over the temporal Druk Desi and religious Je Khenpo. Two successor Shabdrungs – the son (1651) and stepbrother (1680) of Ngawang Namgyal – were effectively controlled by the Druk Desi and Je Khenpo until power was further splintered through the innovation of multiple Shabdrung incarnations, reflecting speech, mind, and body. Increasingly secular regional lords (penlops and dzongpons) competed for power amid a backdrop of civil war over the Shabdrung and invasions from Tibet, and the Mongol Empire. The penlops of Trongsa and Paro, and the dzongpons of Punakha, Thimphu, and Wangdue Phodrang were particularly notable figures in the competition for regional dominance. During this period, there were a total of nine provinces and eight penlops vying for power.

The Penlop of Paro controlled western Bhutan; the rival Penlop of Trongsa controlled eastern Bhutan; and dzongpons controlled areas surrounding their respective dzongs. The Penlop of Paro, unlike Trongsa, was an office appointed by the Druk Desi's central government. Because western regions controlled by the Penlop of Paro contained lucrative trade routes and the most fertile agricultural lands, it became the object of competition among aristocratic families.

The 10th Penlop of Trongsa Jigme Namgyel (r. 1853–1870) began consolidating power, paving the way for his son the 12th Penlop of Trongsa (and 21st Penlop of Paro) Ugyen Wangchuck to prevail in battle against all rival penlops and establish the monarchy in 1907. With the establishment of the monarchy and consolidation of power, the traditional roles of provinces, their rulers, and the "Dual System of Government" came to an end.

== See also ==
- Penlop
- Dzongpen
- House of Wangchuck
- Districts of Bhutan
- History of Bhutan
- Tibetan dual system of government
