= Paro Province =

Historical Province of Bhutan

Provinces of Bhutan

Paro Province (Dzongkha: སྤ་རོ་; Wylie: spa-ro) was one of the nine historical Provinces of Bhutan.

Paro Province occupied lands in western Bhutan, corresponding approximately to modern Paro District. It was administered from the Paro Dzong in the town of Paro. The ruling governor was known as the Penlop of Paro, or Parob, a chief contender for power before the establishment of the monarchy. By the 19th century, the Penlop of Paro effectively controlled the western half of Bhutan.

== History ==
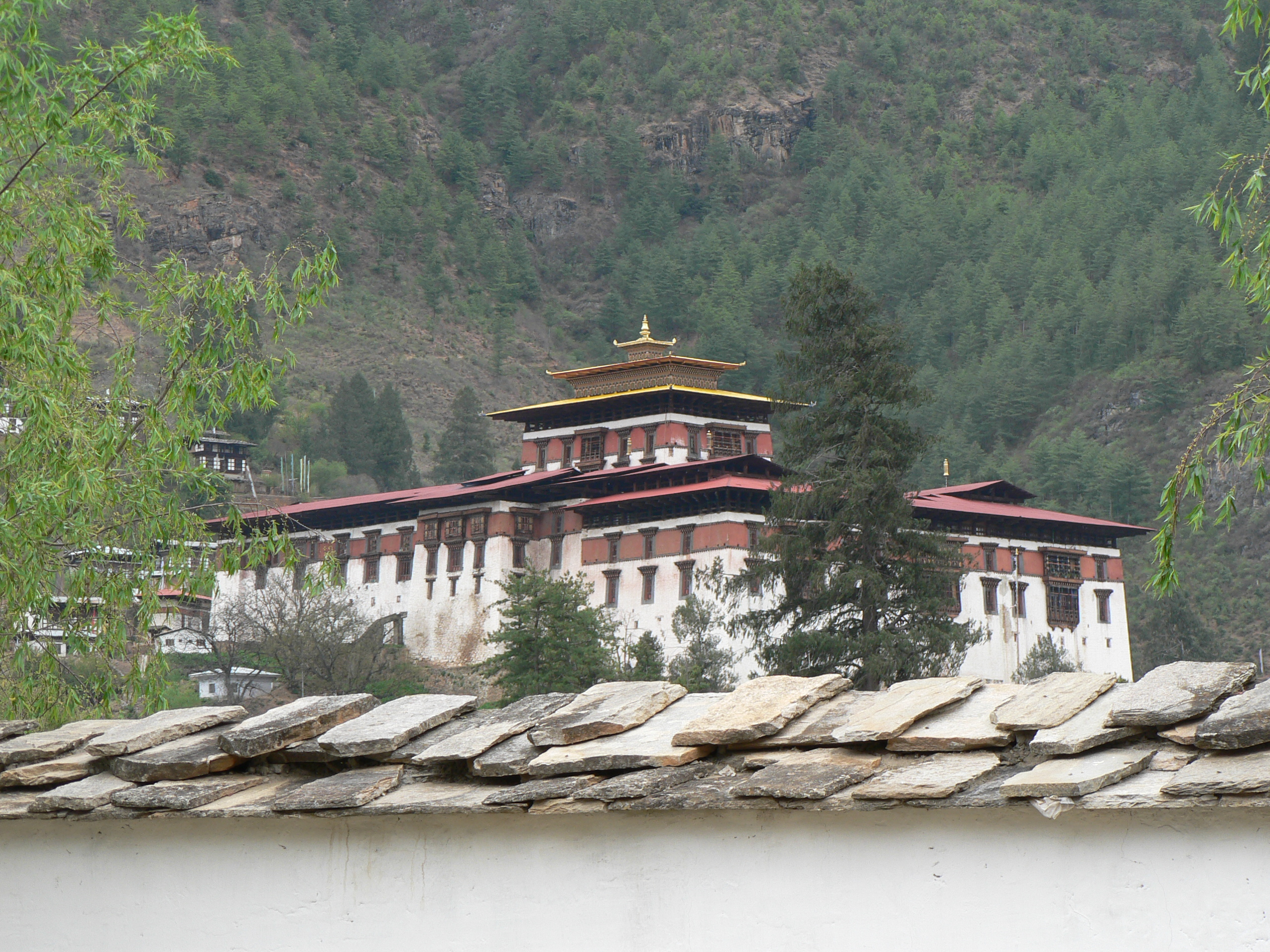
Paro Dzong, administrative headquarters of Paro Province

Under Bhutan's early theocratic dual system of government, decreasingly effective central government control resulted in the de facto disintegration of the office of Shabdrung after the death of Shabdrung Ngawang Namgyal in 1651. Under this system, the Shabdrung reigned over the temporal Druk Desi and religious Je Khenpo. Two successor Shabdrungs – the son (1651) and stepbrother (1680) of Ngawang Namgyal – were effectively controlled by the Druk Desi and Je Khenpo until power was further splintered through the innovation of multiple Shabdrung incarnations, reflecting speech, mind, and body. Increasingly secular regional lords (penlops and dzongpons) competed for power amid a backdrop of civil war over the Shabdrung and invasions from Tibet, and the Mongol Empire. The penlops of Trongsa and Paro, and the dzongpons of Punakha, Thimphu, and Wangdue Phodrang were particularly notable figures in the competition for regional dominance. During this period, there were a total of nine provinces and eight penlops vying for power.

Traditionally, Bhutan comprised nine provinces: Trongsa, Paro, Punakha, Wangdue Phodrang, Daga (also Taka, Tarka, or Taga), Bumthang, Thimphu, Kurtoed (also Kurtoi, Kuru-tod), and Kurmaed (or Kurme, Kuru-mad). The Provinces of Kurtoed and Kurmaed were combined into one local administration, leaving the traditional number of governors at eight. While some lords were Penlops, others held the title Dzongpen (Dzongkha: རྗོང་དཔོན་; Wylie: rjong-dpon; also "Jongpen", "Dzongpön"); both titles may be translated as "governor". The Penlop of Paro controlled western Bhutan; the rival Penlop of Trongsa controlled eastern Bhutan; and dzongpons controlled areas surrounding their respective dzongs. The Penlop of Paro, unlike Trongsa, was an office appointed by the Druk Desi's central government. Because western regions controlled by the Penlop of Paro contained lucrative trade routes, it became the object of competition among aristocratic families.

The 10th Penlop of Trongsa Jigme Namgyel (r. 1853–1870) began consolidating power, paving the way for his son the 12th Penlop of Trongsa (and 21st Penlop of Paro) Ugyen Wangchuck to prevail in battle against all rival penlops and establish the monarchy in 1907. With the establishment of the monarchy and consolidation of power, the traditional roles of provinces, their rulers, and the dual system of government came to an end.

== See also ==
- Provinces of Bhutan
- Penlop
- Dzongpen
- House of Wangchuck
- History of Bhutan
