= Dzongpen =

Bhutanese royal title

Dzongpen (Dzongkha: རྗོང་དཔོན་; Wylie: rjong-dpon; also spelled "Dzongpon," "Dzongpön," "Jongpen," "Jongpon," "Jongpön") is a Dzongkha term which roughly translates to a governor or a dzong lord. Bhutanese dzongpens, prior to unification, controlled certain areas of the country, but now hold no administrative office. Rather, dzongpens are now entirely subservient to the House of Wangchuck.

Traditionally, Bhutan comprised nine provinces: Trongsa, Paro, Punakha, Wangdue Phodrang, Daga (also Taka, Tarka, or Taga), Bumthang, Thimphu, Kurtoed (also Kurtoi, Kuru-tod), and Kurmaed (or Kurme, Kuru-mad). The Provinces of Kurtoed and Kurmaed were combined into one local administration, leaving the traditional number of governors at eight. While some lords ruled from dzongs (dzongpens), others held the title of penlop (Dzongkha: དཔོན་སློབ་; Wylie: dpon-slob; also "Ponlop"), a title also translated as "governor," though penlops tended to be more powerful.

Dzongpens ruled in Byagha, Dalay, Dalingkote, Ha, Kham, Punakha (the "Punab"), Singhi, Tashichho Dzong, Thimphu (the "Thimphub"), Tuwa, and Wangdue Phodrang (the "Wangzob").

Under the dual system of government, penlops and dzongpens were theoretically masters of their own realms but servants of the Druk Desi. In practice, however, they were under minimal central government control, and the Penlop of Trongsa and Penlop of Paro dominated the rest of the local lords. And while all governor posts were officially appointed by Shabdrung Ngawang Namgyal, later the Druk Desi, some offices such as the Penlop of Trongsa were de facto hereditary and appointed within certain families. Penlops and dzongpens often held other government offices such as Druk Desi, governor of other provinces, or a second or third term in the same office.

== History ==
Under Bhutan's early theocratic dual system of government, decreasingly effective central government control resulted in the de facto disintegration of the office of Shabdrung after the death of Shabdrung Ngawang Namgyal in 1651. Under this system, the Shabdrung reigned over the temporal Druk Desi and religious Je Khenpo. Two successor Shabdrungs – the son (1651) and stepbrother (1680) of Ngawang Namgyal – were effectively controlled by the Druk Desi and Je Khenpo until power was further splintered through the innovation of multiple Shabdrung incarnations, reflecting speech, mind, and body. Increasingly secular regional lords (penlops and dzongpens) competed for power amid a backdrop of civil war over the Shabdrung and invasions from Tibet, and the Mongol Empire. The penlops of Trongsa and Paro, and the dzongpons of Punakha, Thimphu, and Wangdue Phodrang were particularly notable figures in the competition for regional dominance.

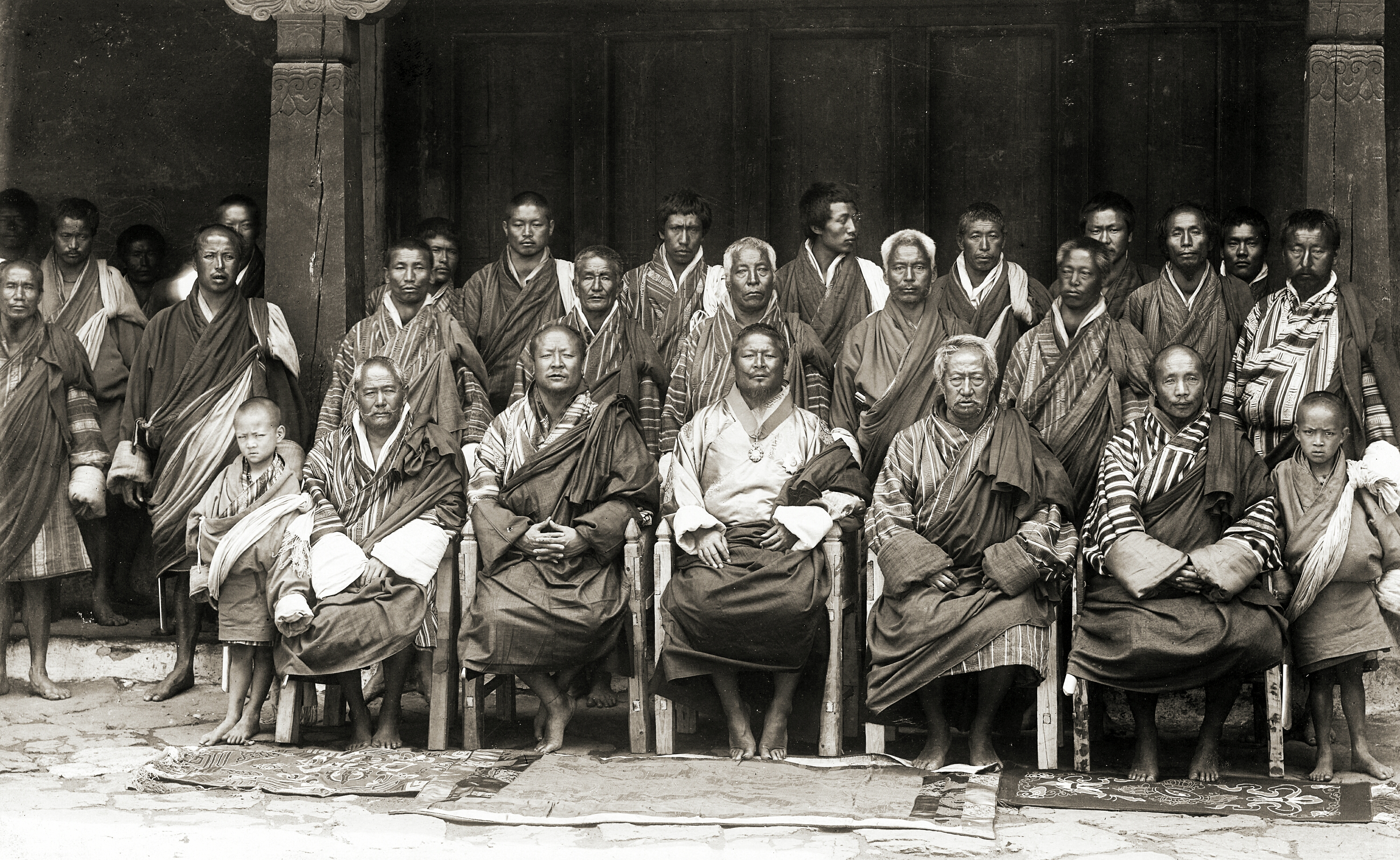
Ugyen Wangchuck surrounded by his councillors at Punakha, Bhutan, 1905. Front Row: son of Thimphu Jongpen, Punakha Jongpen, Thimphu Jongpen, Trongsa Penlop, Zung Donyer [dronyer], Deb Zimpon, and elder son of Thimphu Jongpen.

Within this political landscape, the Wangchuck family originated in the Bumthang region of central Bhutan. The family belongs to the Nyö clan, and is descended from Pema Lingpa, a Bhutanese Nyingmapa saint. The Nyö clan emerged as a local aristocracy, supplanting many older aristocratic families of Tibetan origin that sided with Tibet during invasions of Bhutan. In doing so, the clan came to occupy the hereditary position of Penlop of Trongsa, as well as significant national and local government positions.

The Penlop of Trongsa controlled central and eastern Bhutan; the rival Penlop of Paro controlled western Bhutan; and dzongpons controlled areas surrounding their respective dzongs. Eastern dzongpens were generally under the control of the Penlop of Trongsa, who was officially endowed with the power to appoint them in 1853. The Penlop of Paro, unlike Trongsa, was an office appointed by the Druk Desi's central government. Because western regions controlled by the Penlop of Paro contained lucrative trade routes, it became the object of competition among aristocratic families.

== Punakha Dzongpens ==
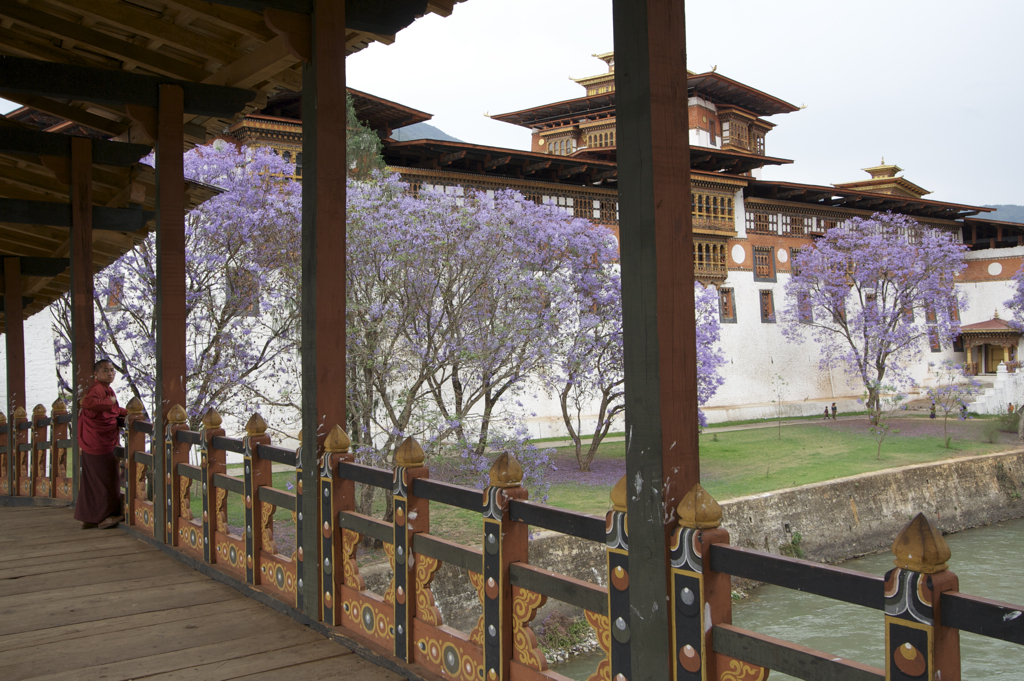
Punakha Dzong, administrative fortress of the Punabs

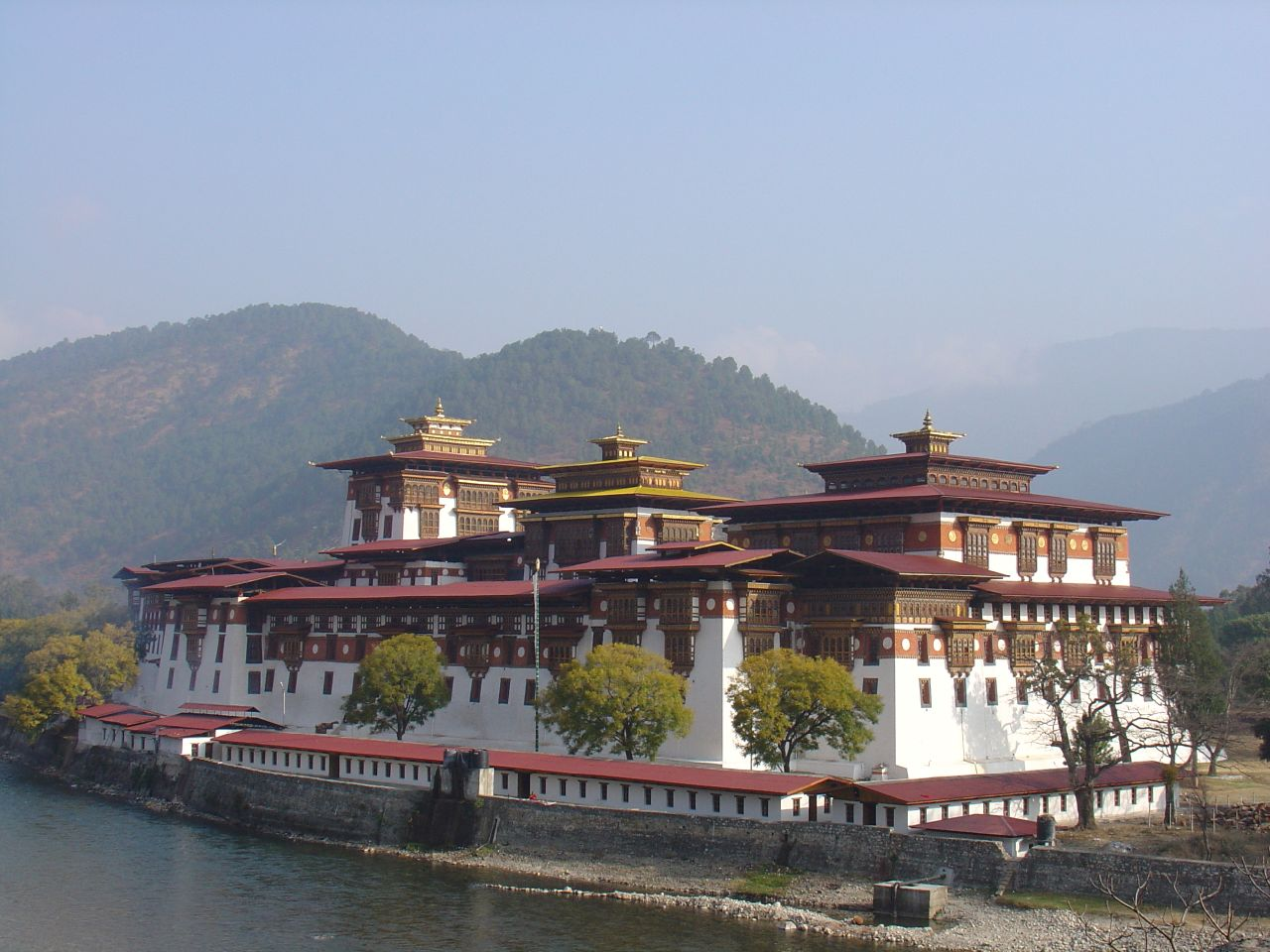
Punakha Dzong

Below are the Dzongpens of Punakha, also called "Punab."

Punakha Dzongpens
Number	Name
1	Punab Pekar Rubgye
2	Punab Tenzin Drukda
3	Punab Druk Pelzang
4	Punab Tenpa Wangchuck
5	Punab Dalub Tobgye
6	Punab Dang Tashi
7	Punab Damchho Rinchhen
8	Punab Ngodub
9	Punab Phuntsho Dorji
10	Punab Thonglay
11	Punab Wangchuck
12	Punab Wangsha

== Thimphu Dzongpens ==
Below are the Dzongpens of Thimphu, also called "Thimphub."

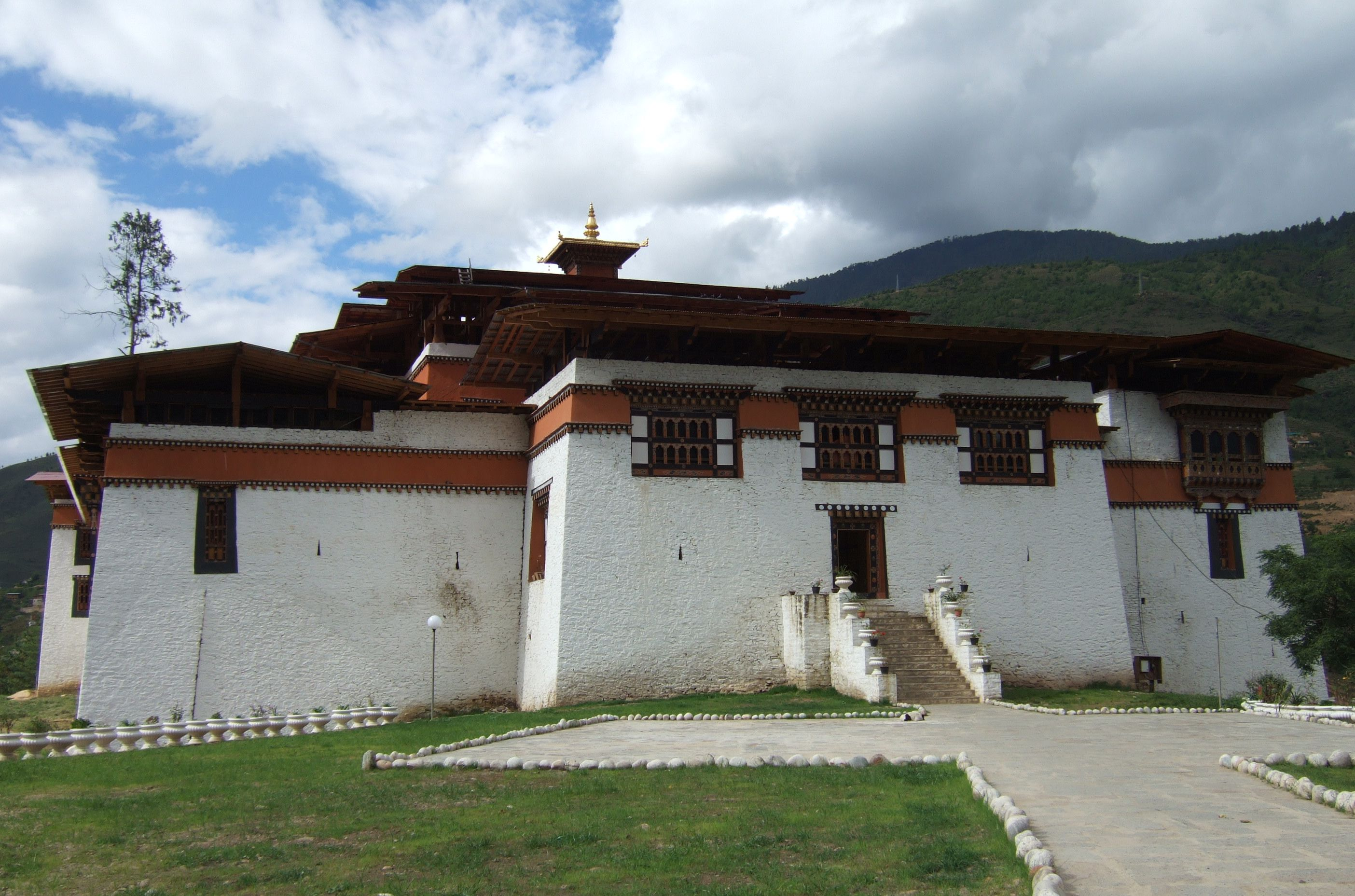
Simtokha Dzong, historical administrative center of Thimphu

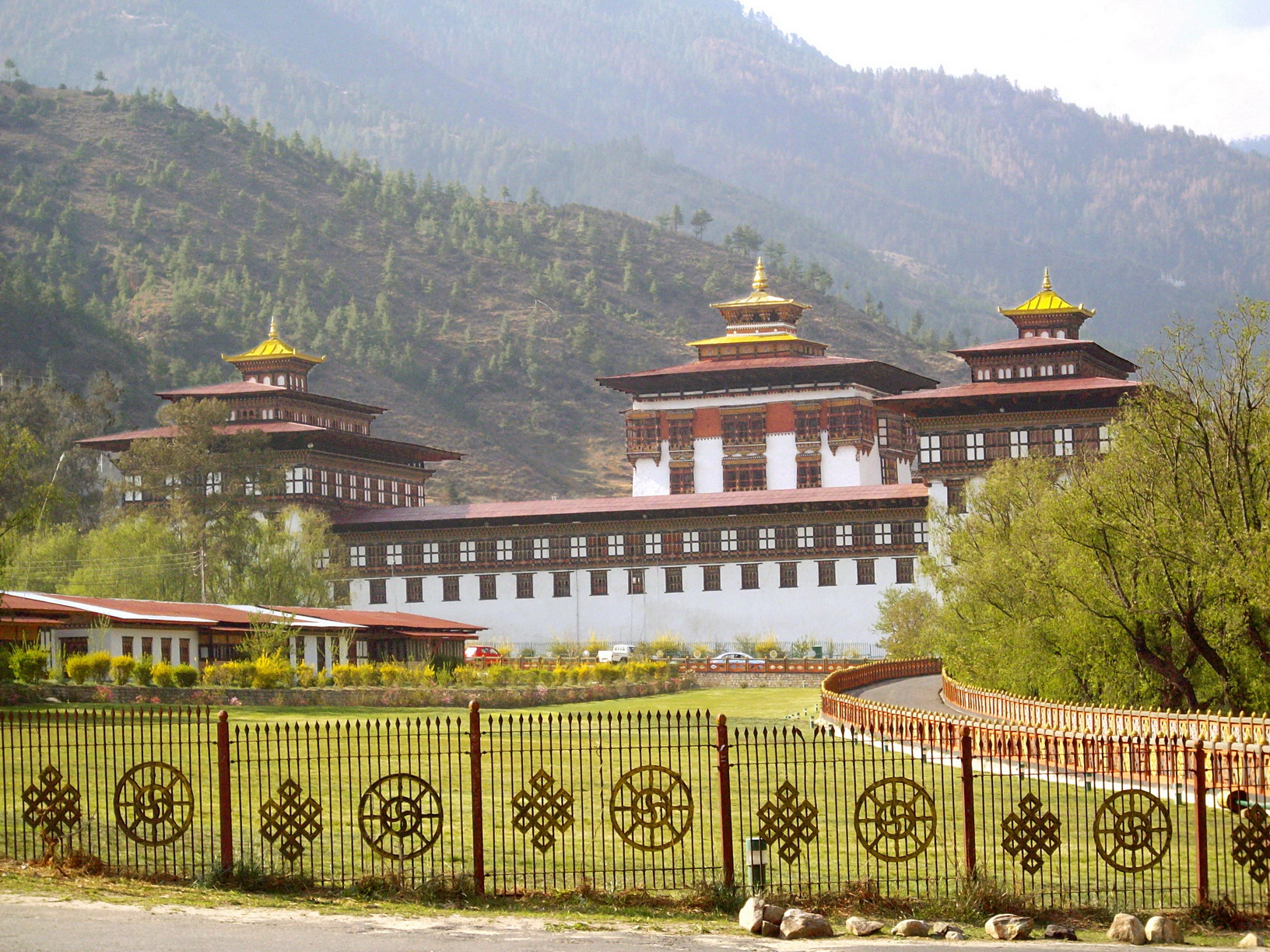
Tashichho Dzong, administrative center of Thimphu

Thimphu Dzongpens
Number	Name
1	Thimphub Awu Tshering
2	Thimphub Norbu
3	Thimphub Ngwang Gyeltshen
4	Thimphub Tashi Dorji
5	Thimphub Druk Rubgye
6	Thimphub Sonam Drugyel
7	Thimphub Dondub
8	Thimphub Druk Phuntsho
9	Thimphub Druk Tenzin
10	Thimphub Chhoki Gyeltshen (Tshewang Rinchhen) (Note: Tshewang Rinchhen assassinated Druk Desi Wangchuck Gyalpo in 1851; the same year, Wangzob Chaap had Tshewang Rinchhen assassinated.)
11	Thimphub Uma Dewa (Sherub Tharchhin) (Note: Uma Dewa (Sherub Tharchhin) was assassinated by Zimpon Dachung in 1857.)
12	Thimphub Kasha
13	Thimphub Karma Drugyel
14	Thimphub Khasab Tobgye
15	Thimphub Kawang Manghkhel
16	Thimphub Lama Thewang
17	Thimphub Alu Dorji
18	Thimphub Kunzang Thinley
19	Thimphub Pema
20	Thimphub Kunzang Thinley (Note: Second tenure. Father of First Queen Tsundue Pema Lhamo)

== Wangdue Dzongpens ==
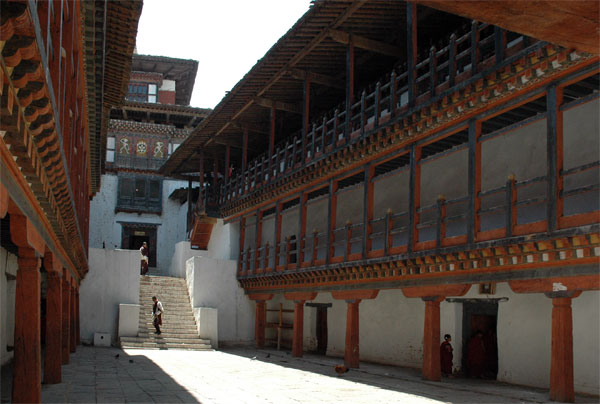
Wangdue Phodrang Dzong

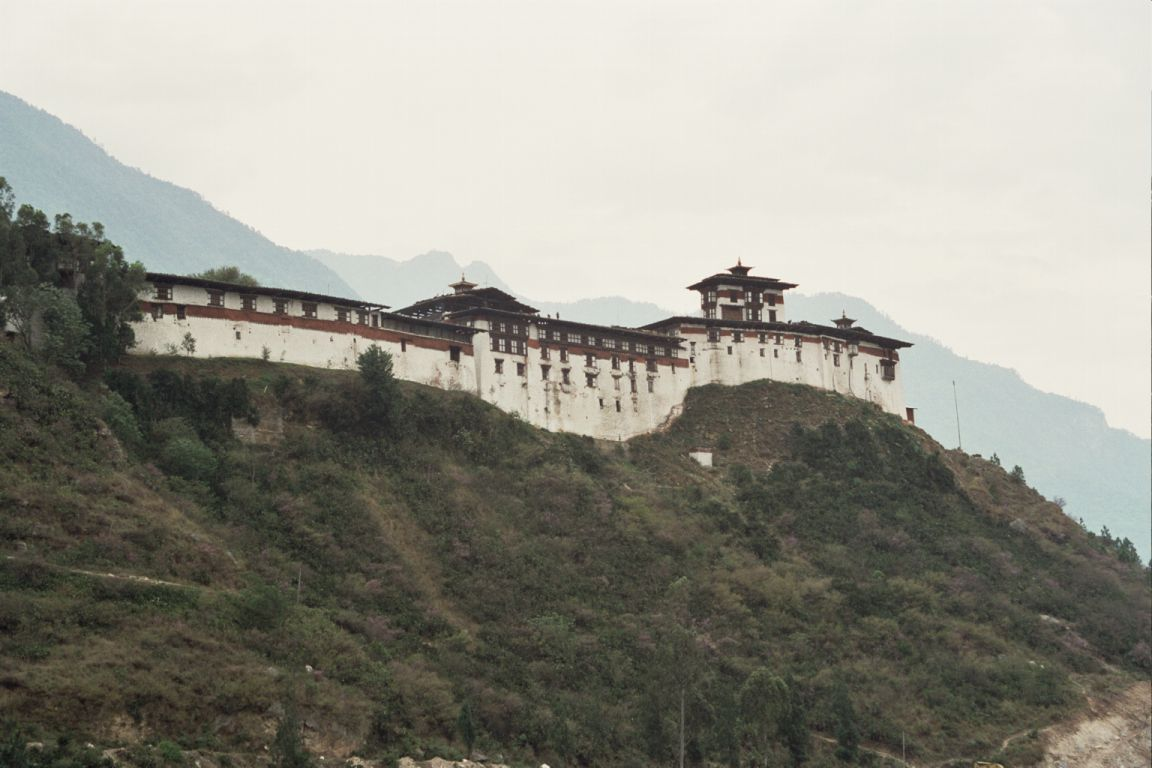
Wangdue Phodrang Dzong

Below are the Dzongpens of Wangdue Phodrang, also called "Wangzob."

Wangdue Dzongpens
Number	Name
1	Wangzob Chhoje Namkha Rinchhen
2	Wangzob Gedun Chhophel
3	Wangzob Ngwang Tshering
4	Wangzob Druk Tenzin
5	Wangzob Sangye Tenzin
6	Wangzob Lepi Sherub
7	Wangzob Sonam Lhundup
8	Wangzob Sangay
9	Wangzob Kunga Gyeltshen
10	Wangzob Phuntsho Namgyel
11	Wangzob Dalub Tobgye
12	Wangzob Sigay
13	Wangzob Tenzin Namgyel
14	Wangzob Kawang Sangay
15	Wangzob Angdu
16	Wangzob Jigme Namgyel (Note: Father of First King Ugyen Wangchuck)
17	Wangzob Thinley Tobgye
18	Wangzob Ashang Jampa
19	Wangzob Kodu
20	Wangzob Domchu

== See also ==
- Penlop
- Penlop of Trongsa
- House of Wangchuck
- History of Bhutan
