= Trongsa Dzong =

Fortress in Trongsa, Bhutan

Trongsa Dzong Chhoekhor Raptentse Dzong Choetse Dzong
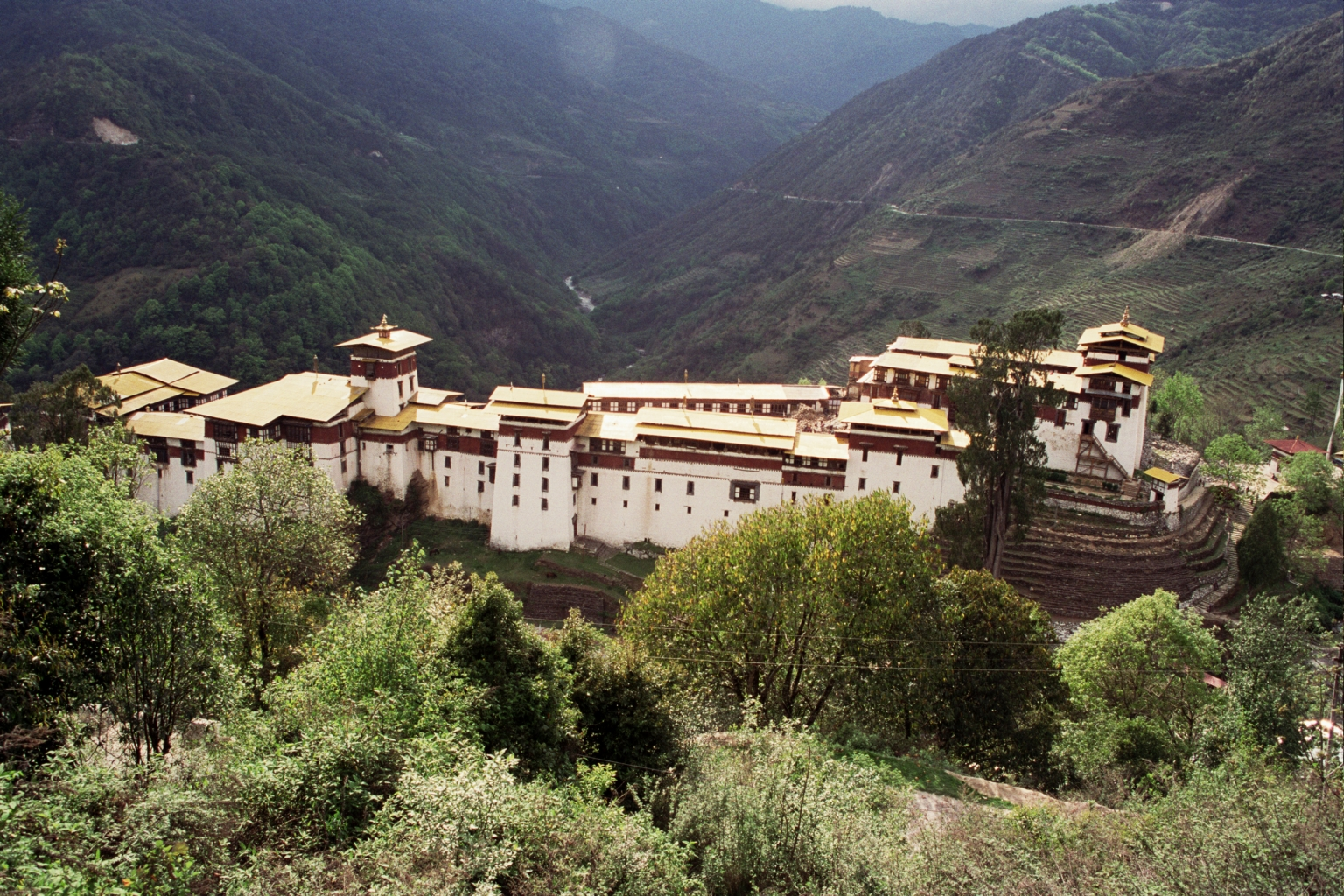
- Trongsa Dzong

- Location within Bhutan

Religion
- Affiliation: Tibetan Buddhism
- Sect: Drukpa

Location
- Location: Trongsa, Trongsa district, Bhutan
- Country: Bhutan
- Interactive map of Trongsa Dzong; Chhoekhor Raptentse Dzong; Choetse Dzong
- Coordinates: 27°29′58″N 90°30′17″E

Architecture
- Style: Dzong
- Founder: Nagi Wangchuk (1543)
- Established: As a dzong by Shabdrung Ngawang Namgyal in 1647; 379 years ago.

Trongsa Dzong is the largest dzong fortress in Bhutan, located in Trongsa (formerly Tongsa) in Trongsa district, in the centre of the country. Built on a spur overlooking the gorge of the Mangde River, a temple was first established at the location in 1543 by the Drukpa lama, Nagi Wangchuk son of Ngawang Chhojey. In 1647, his great-grandson Shabdrung Ngawang Namgyal (Shabdrung or Zhabdrung being his title), constructed the first dzong to replace it, called Chökhor Rabtentse Dzong with a shorter version of Choetse Dzong. It was enlarged several times during the 18th century; the Chenrezig Lhakang was built in 1715 and a whole complex, including the Maitreya (Jampa) temple, was added in 1771. The dzong has since been repaired on several occasions; it was damaged during the 1897 Assam earthquake and underwent extensive renovation in 1927 and 1999.

Trongsa Dzong, the largest dzong at a striking location, is an important administrative building, providing the headquarters of the government of Trongsa District. Trongsa provides a strategic central location to control Bhutan and for centuries it was the seat of the Wangchuck dynasty of penlops (governors) who effectively ruled over much of eastern and central Bhutan, and from 1907 have been Kings of Bhutan. It is also a major monastic complex, with around 200 monks. During the summer months, the monastic community often relocates to Kurje Monastery in the Bumthang Valley. It contains a notable printing house, responsible for the printing of many religious texts in Bhutan.). It is listed as a tentative site in Bhutan's Tentative List for UNESCO inclusion.

== Geography ==
The Dzong and the small town surrounding it are situated on a spur, a wild rocky area, above the ravines of the Mangde Chuu valley with the scenic backdrop of the Black Mountains on its southwest. The Dzong is located above the fast flowing Mandge Chu in a unique setting that has been described as "the most spectacularly sited dzong in Bhutan with a sheer drop to the south that often disappears into cloud and mist".

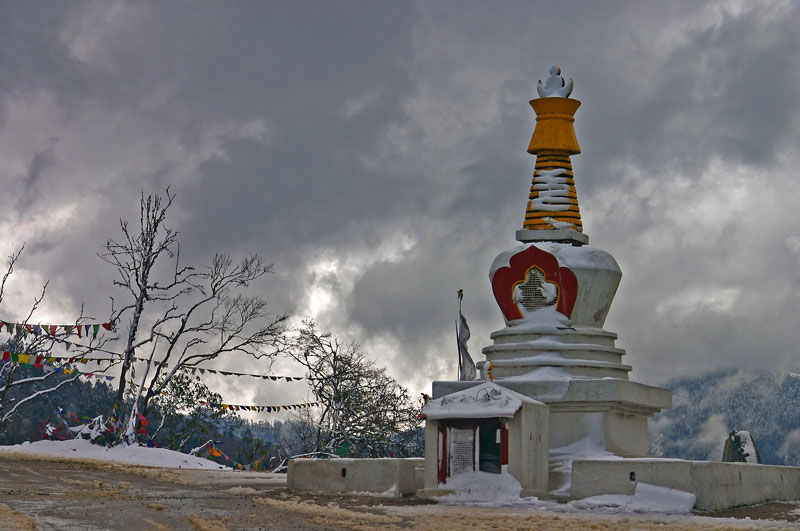
Chorten in Nepalese style at Pele La on the foot track to Trongsa Dzong.

Approach to Trongsa, till 1970, was only from the upper reaches of the Mangde Chu valley, starting the descent to the Trongsa town and the dzong from the location of two small chortens at Chendebji (One built by Lama Shida in Nepali style in the 18th century and the other a new one built in Bhutanese style in 1982)), which is 14 kilometres (8.7 mi) away along foot tracks, after crossing the Pela La pass (3,330 metres (10,930 ft)). This trackroute traverses through farms, deciduous forests, crosses side streams, raises to Tangsibji village before descending to the Mangde Chu valley. The vegetation seen along the route consists of shrubs of edgeworthia (high altitude dwarf bamboo), which are used for making paper. Fauna encountered on this route are mainly brown monkeys - the rhesus macaques. En route at Tashiling, a new Potala Lhakhang could be seen alongside a wrathful statue of Guru Rinpoche. The Potala Lhakhang was built in 2005 and is housing a 9 metres (30 ft) high statue of Chenresig. Arriving at the head of the valley, there is an extensive view of the large white Trashi Dzong.

From Thimpu, the capital city on the west, the journey is by road, of about 7 hours, passing through mountain ranges on the east and west directions. The road is aligned above the Dzong, passes through a vegetable market and then through a small palace. This palace is where the late king Jigme Dorji Wangchuk (the third king of Butan) was born in 1928.

== History ==
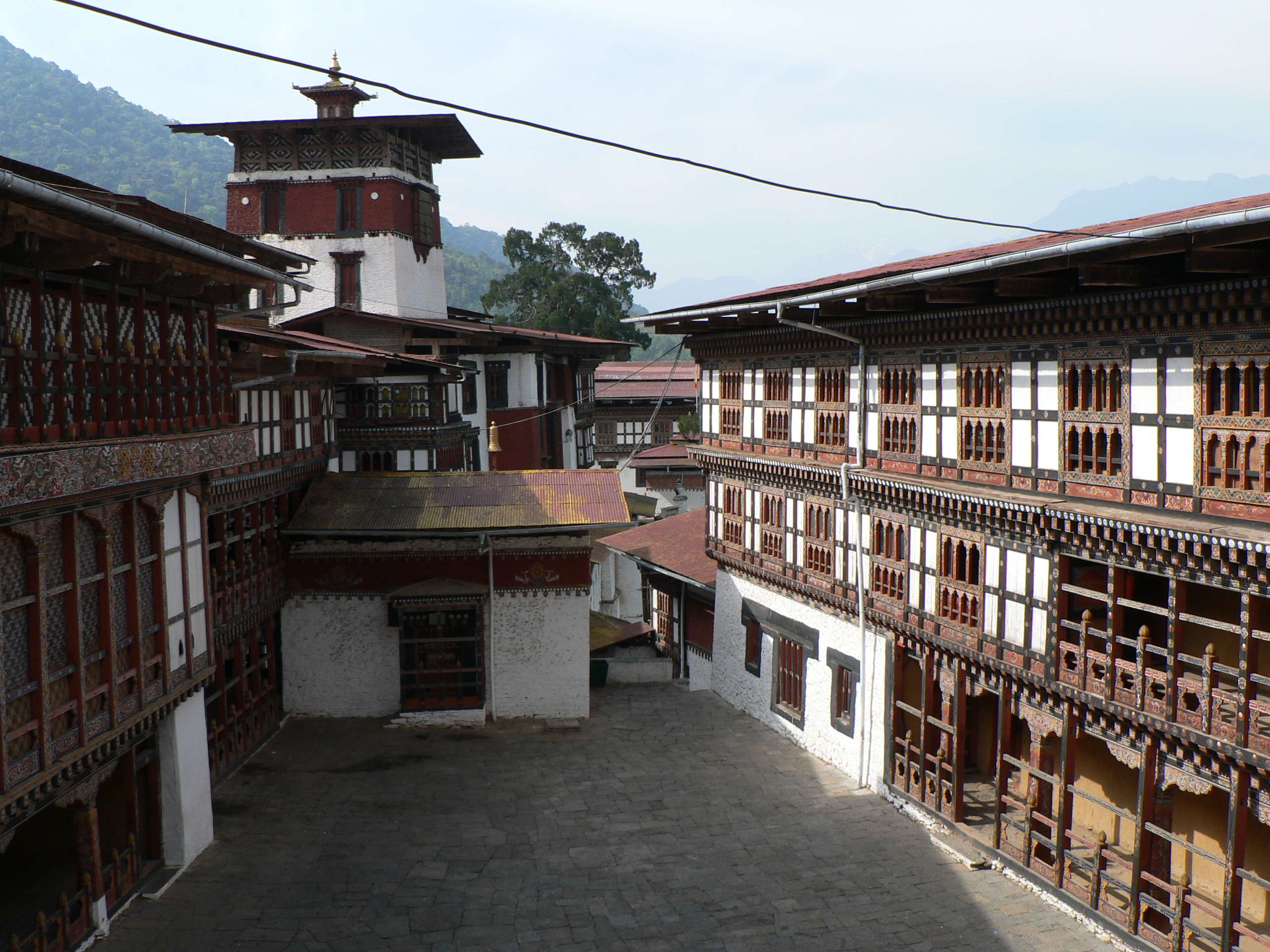
Courtyard

Trongsa means "the new village" in Bhutanese, which comprises retreats, temples and hermitages of monks. Its rich history is traced to the founding of a temple in the area by the Drukpa lama, Ngagi Wangchuk, ancestor of Shabdrung Namgyal, who came to this place from Ralung in 1541, and built a small meditation room in 1543. One day he had been meditating nearby in a village called Yuling and witnessed a light ("from a body of lamps") at the furthest point of the spur. He believed this to be an auspicious sign and erected a temple on the spot, on a mountain spur high above the gorges of the Mangde Chhu, at an altitude of 2,200 metres (7,200 ft). Note: the altitude is given as 2,300 metres (7,500 ft) by Dorje. Another version for building a temple here is that Ngagi Wangchuk saw self-manifest hoof prints of a horse that belonged to the Protector deity Palden Lhamo. He then decided to build a small meditation centre, a tshamkhang, at that location. One more version of the legend states that Ngagi Wangchuk after witnessing the lights from lamps, went into a cave nearby for meditation where he found a small spring. He also visioned that the spring had been used by the Mahakali (Peldon Lhamo) for sacred ablutions with other dakinis. He then built a small temple, which has now become the main temple Gunkhang. He also developed it into a small village with several houses and the place thus came to be known as drongsar ("new village") and popularly known in the local dialect as 'Trongsa'. He further inferred from the shape of the rocky hill, that it was in the form a conch shell with concentric rings (in clockwise direction) and hence named the monastery as Choe-Khor-Rab-Ten-Tse or by a shorter version as Chotse that represents " the temple fixed firmly at the tip of the dharma wheel-the conchshell". The original temple site is today located at the end of the dzong, at the Temple of Chortens.

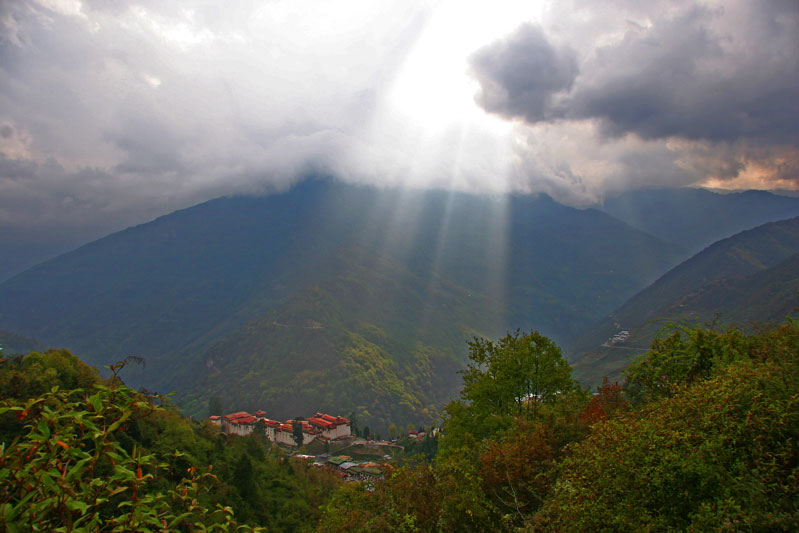
Panorama of Trongsa Dzong.

In 1647, the great-grandson of Ngagi Wangchuk, Shabdrung Ngawang Namgyal, noted for the building of several other prominent buildings in Bhutan, began constructing a dzong in Trongsa, given its strategical importance. He named it the Chökhor Rabtentse Dzong and it was the seat of power of the Wangchuck dynasty before they became rulers of Bhutan in 1907. The rulers of Trongsa, the penlops of the Wangchuck dynasty, who resided at Trongsa Dzong were very powerful, exerting influence over all of eastern and central Bhutan, controlling east-west trade for centuries. The only road connecting eastern and western Bhutan (the precursor to the modern Lateral Road), passed through the courtyard of the dzong. By the 19th century, the penlops, ruling from Trongsa Dzong, had become so powerful that Trongsa had effectively become the capital of Bhutan, although never officially so. Its strategic location added to its importance on the east-west trade route and was a source of revenue to the Trongsa penlop. They later became the monarchs of Bhutan that rule to this day.

Sir Ugyen Wangchuck, the first ruler of Bhutan was the Penlop at Trongsa before he was crowned the King of Bhutan in 1907. However, he retained the position of Penlop as well.

In 1652, Minjur Tempa, the then Penlop of Trongsa, had the dzong enlarged. In 1715, the Penlop Druk Dendrup built the Chenrezig (Avalokiteshvara) Lhakang and in 1765, Penlop Zhidar established a monastic community of around 50 monks at the dzong. In 1771, a whole complex, including the Maitreya (Jampa) temple was added to provide for the monks. In 1853, the 10th Penlop of Trongsa, Jigme Namgyal, who was the father of the first king. erected the Demchog (Cakrasamvara) Lhakhang, in the central section of the dzong.

Trongsa Dzong was heavily damaged following the 1897 Assam earthquake. It underwent major repair and was restored by both the 1st king, Ugyen Wangchuck and the 2nd king, Jigme Wangchuck in 1927, who renovated the Chenrezig Lhakhang in particular. In 1999, funding from Austria led to extensive restoration works and was reconsecrated in October 2004, coinciding with the enthronement of the Crown Prince.

The old village of Trongsar is located below, but there is a new village of Trongsar, which has been under construction on the mountainside since 1982. Tibetan immigrants settled in the valley in late 1950s and early 1960. The shopkeepers are mainly of Bhutanese and Tibetan origin.

== Architecture ==
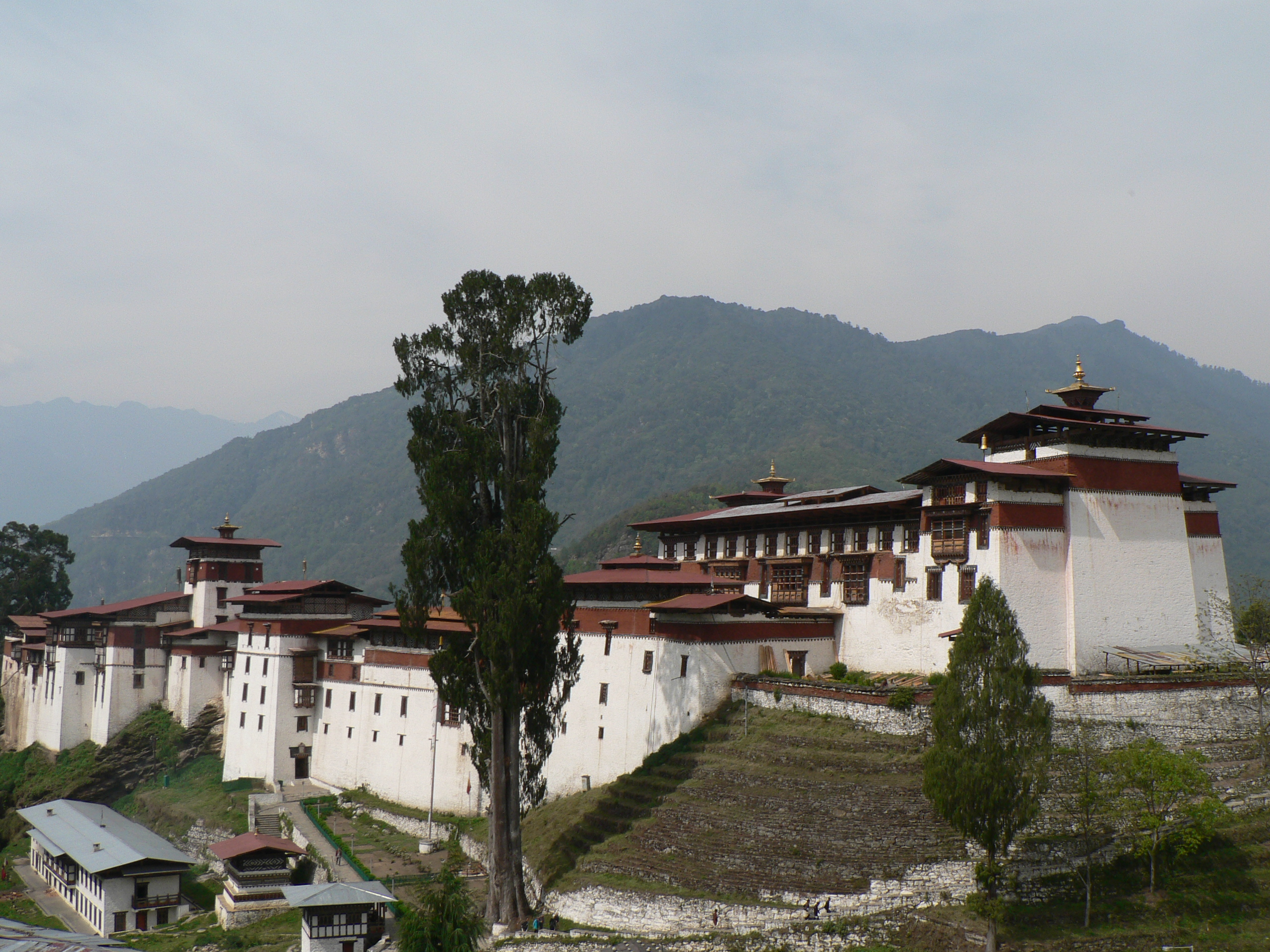
General view of Trongsa dzong.

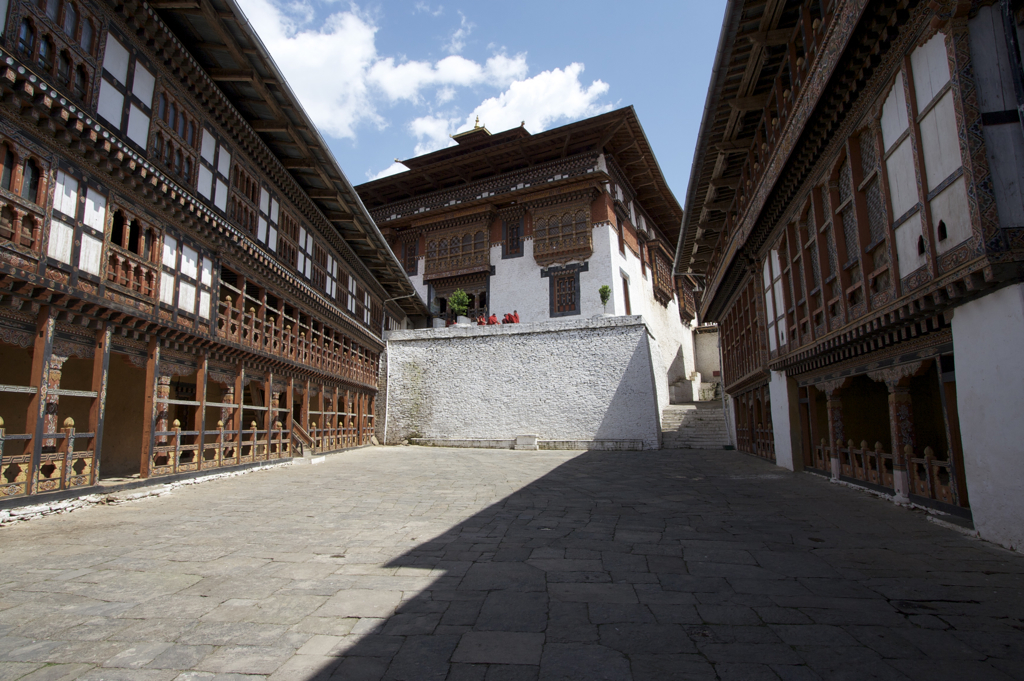
Interior courtyard in Trongsa Dzong.

Trongsa Dzong is a powerfully built fortress and is exemplary of dzong architecture. The Trongsa Dzong is an extensive complex; the largest in all of Bhutan, and is set on many different levels. It consists of a maze of courtyards, passageways and corridors and the complex contains as many as 25 temples. The most important temples are those dedicated to the Tantric deities of Yamāntaka, Hevajra, Cakrasaṃvara and Kālacakra. The Maitreya (Jampa) temple was erected in 1771 and today contains a clay statue of the Buddha of the Future, donated by King Ugyen Wangchuck in the early 20th century. The Temple of Chortens is located on the spot where the original 1543 temple had stood. It contains the funerary chorten of Ngagi Wangchuk and has 16 paintings of the Arhats and of the Buddha Akshobhya (Mitrugpa). The watchtower of the fortress, named Ta Dzong, towers above the gorge to the east side of the dzong. The watchtower is narrow and has two wings that project in a v-shape from the main part of the building. It also contains a temple, established in 1977 to honour the warrior god, King Gesar. In 2008, a museum was added to this complex, following Austrian donations. The interior decorations in the temples are attributed to the time of the reign of the first ruler, king Ugyen Wangchuk. However, the Dzong has undergone renovations in recent years with assistance provided by an Austrian team. The original design of the northern assembly hall, an original court scene with mural paintings of the guardians of four directions, Phurba statue in the main hall, a mural replica of Swayambunath temple of Nepal and a pictorial map of Lhasa are retained.

Ta Dzong, the watch tower, that was in the past a stronghold against internal insurgencies, towering over the east side of the dzong, has since been converted into a state-of-the Art Museum (National Museum) with technical and financial support provided by Austria. The tower also houses a chapel dedicated to the Jigme Namgyal who was penlop in the 19th century. It is also stated that in the dungeon of the tower two British soldiers were imprisoned during the Duar War. The Ta Dzong tower originally was a highly fortified six-storied tower, with numerous galleries in the thick walls for defense. Further fortifications in the form of three independent towers were added at a higher elevation in close vicinity of the Ta Dzong.

Aside from its central administrative offices, Trongsa is a major monastery and today houses around 200 monks. They are also affiliated Kurje Monastery in the Choekhor Valley of Bumthang and some of them often spend their summers at Kurje. An important printing house is also located at the dzong, where printing of religious texts is done by traditional woodblock printing.

== Festival ==
A five-day festival known as the Trongsa tsechu is held in the northern courtyard of the temple during December or January. Every monastery in Bhutan observes this festival, which celebrates the arrival of Guru Rimpoche to Bhutan in the 8th century, a mark of triumph of Buddhism over evil. It is held in spring and autumn seasons according to the Bhutanese calendar and masked dances are a popular feature along with the exposition of a very large thanka (religious painting) on cloth of Guru Rimpoche and other figures called the thongdrel. A fire blessing in the form of people running through "an archway of blazing straw" is also witnessed.

== Gallery ==
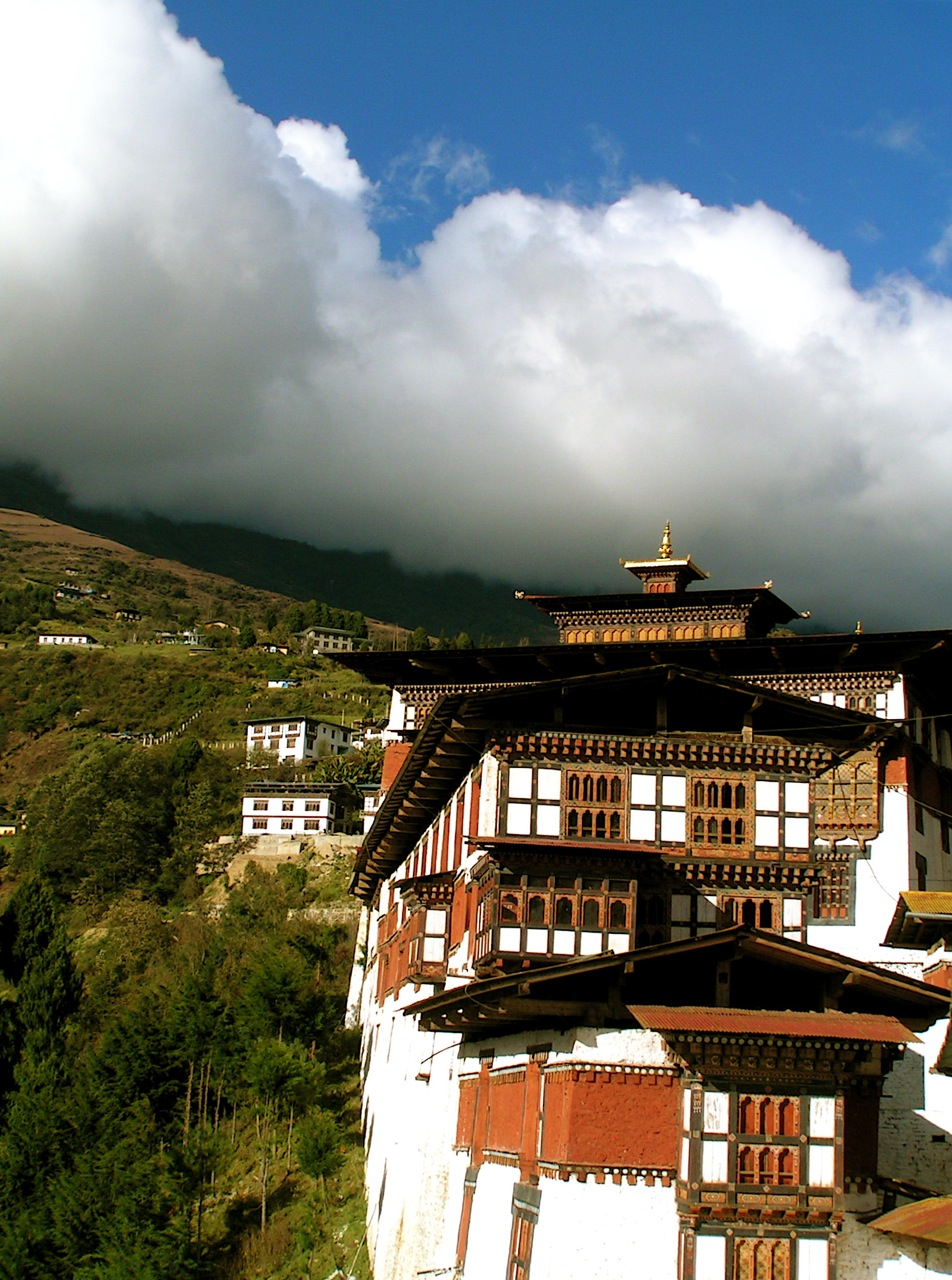
One side of the Dzong

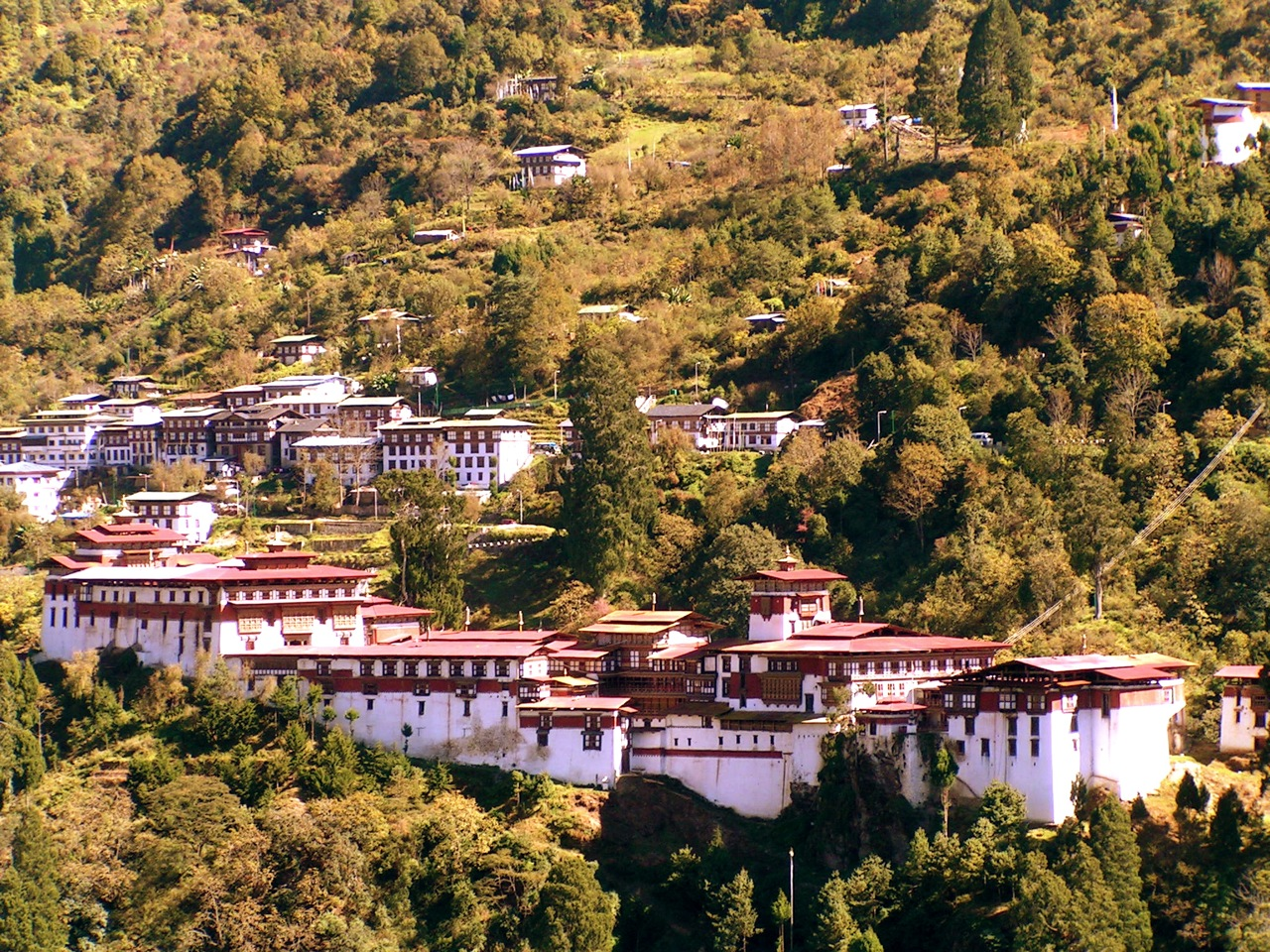
A panoramic view of the Trongsa Dzong within Trongsa town setting

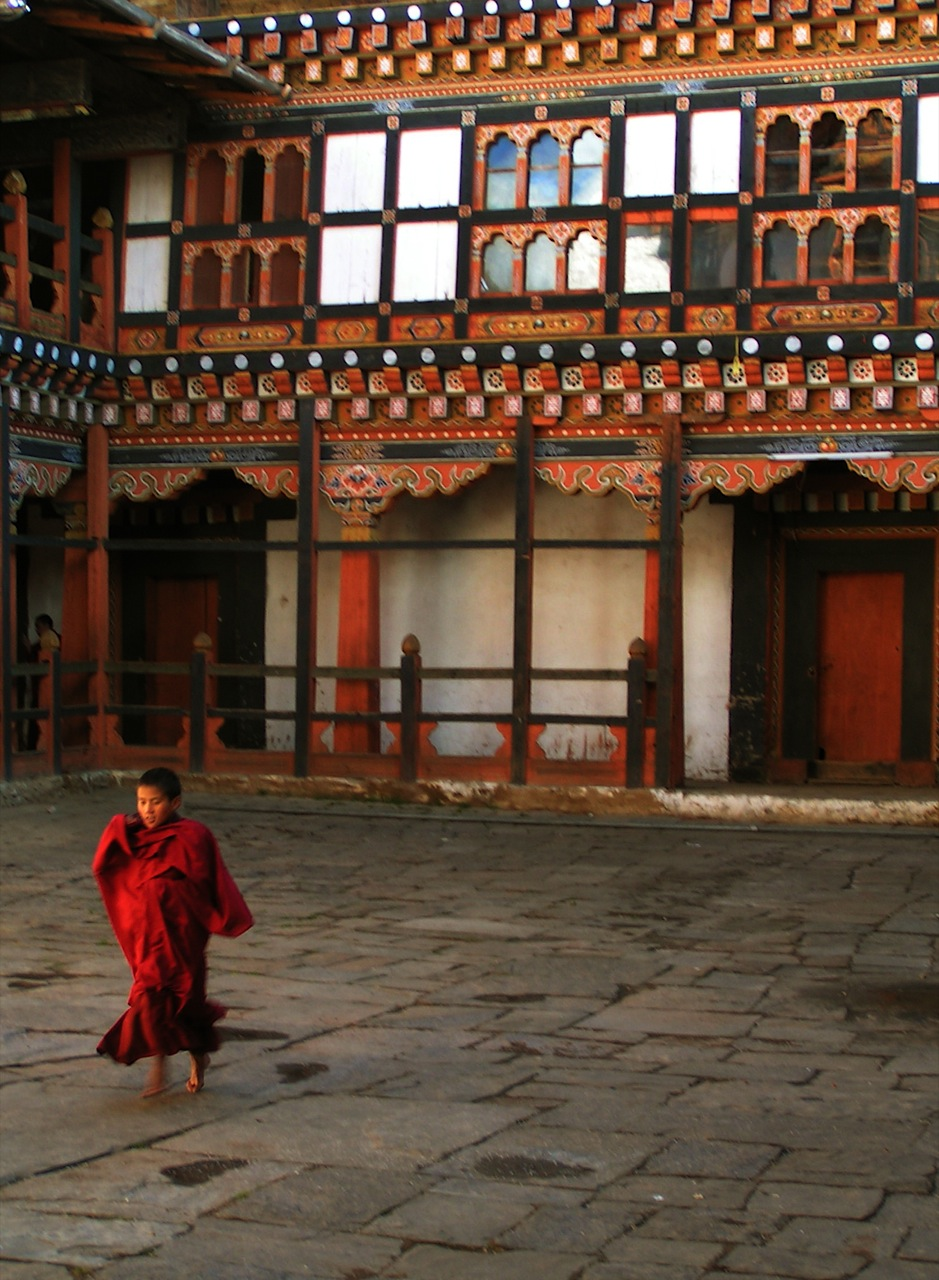
Inner courtyard of Trongsa Dzong

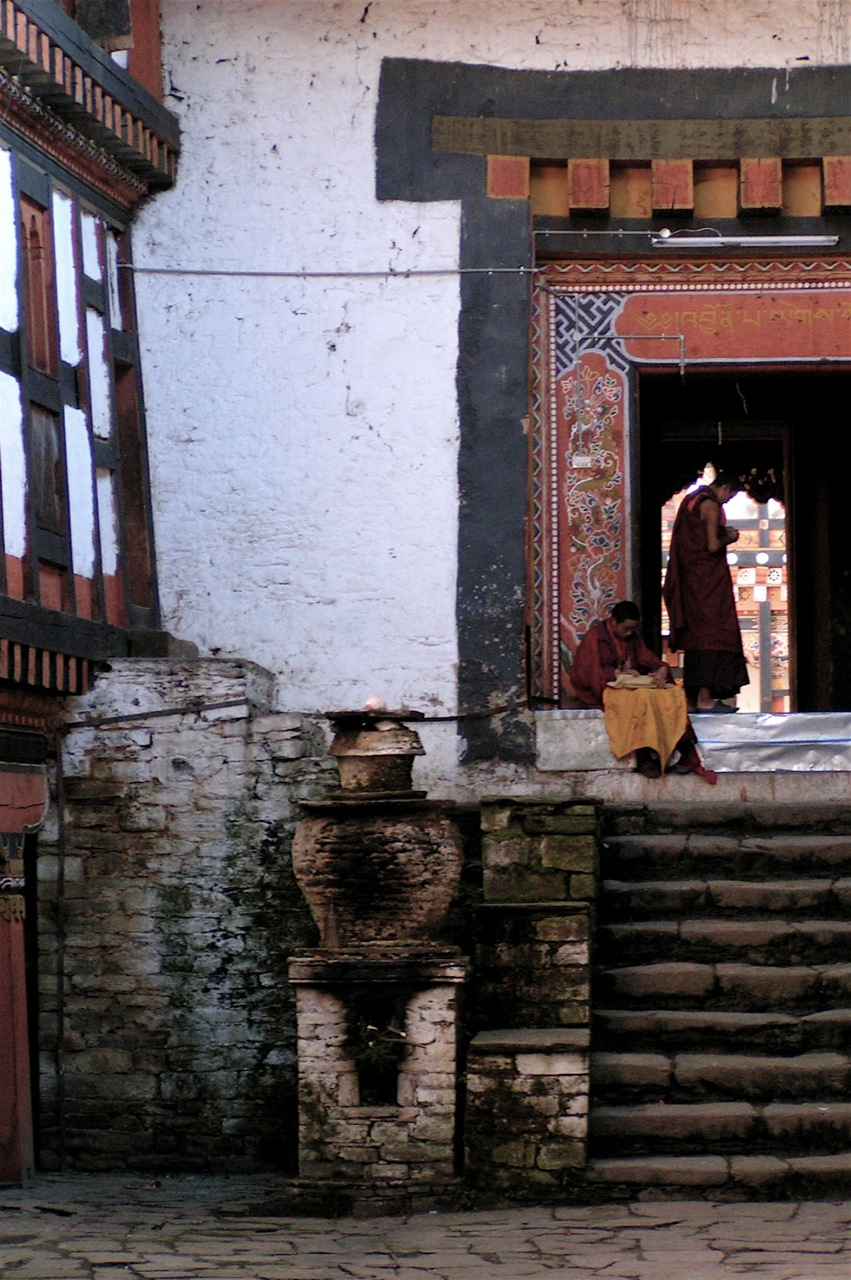
Front entrance to the Dzong

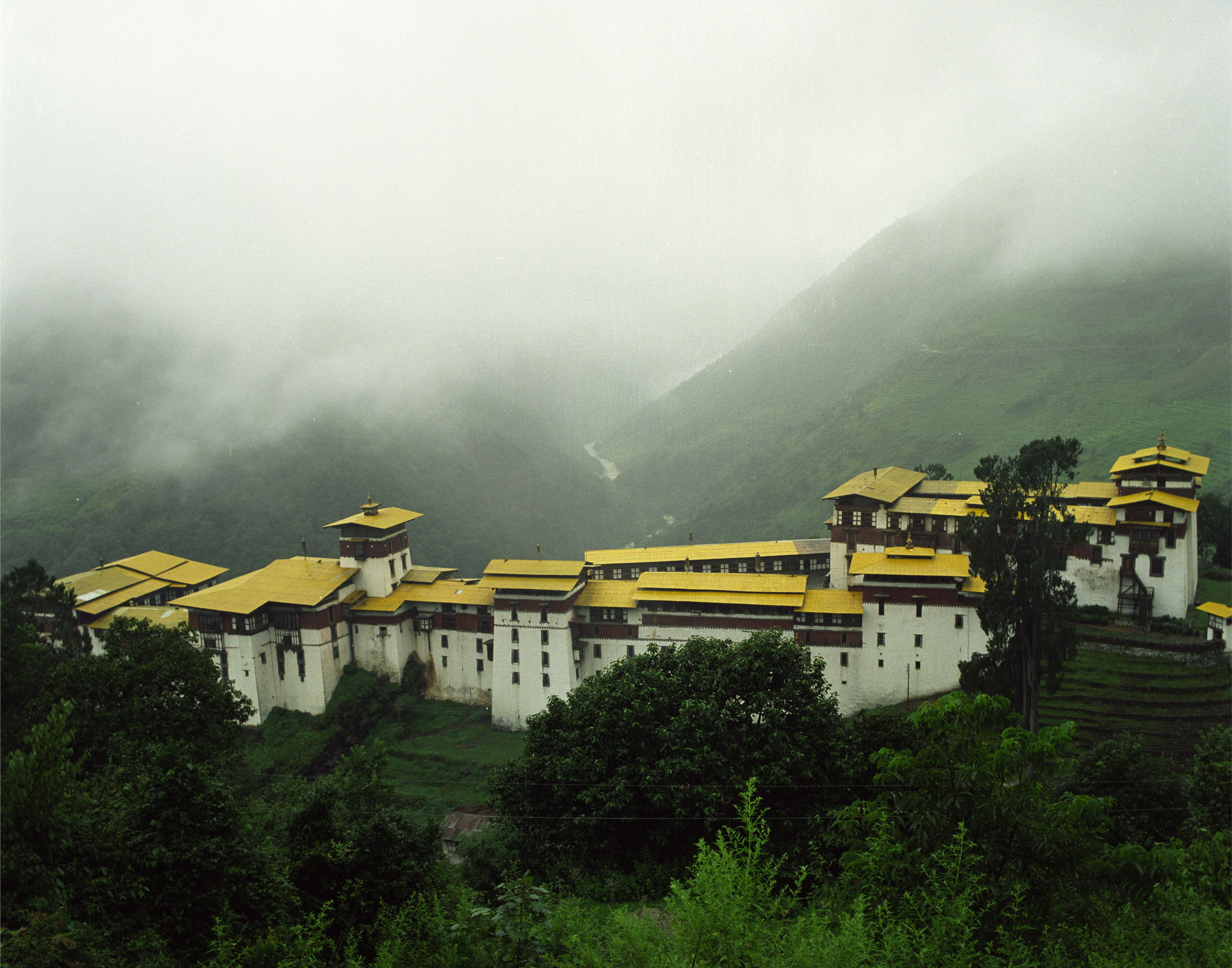
View of Trongsa Dzong (2001)

== Bibliography ==
- Dorje, Gyurme (1999). Footprint Tibet Handbook with Bhutan. Footprint Books, Bath, England. p. 856. ISBN 1-900949-33-4.
- Pommaret, Francoise (2006). Bhutan Himalayan Mountains Kingdom (5th ed.). Odyssey Books and Guides. ISBN 962-217-757-3
