= Jigme Namgyal (Bhutan) =

Bhutanese ruler; Founder of the Wangchuck dynasty

- 51st Druk Desi of Bhutan; 10th Penlop of Trongsa
- Full name: Desi Jigme Namgyal
- Born: 1825; Lhuntse Dzong
- Died: 1881 (aged 55–56); Semtokha Dzong, Thimphu valley
- Spouse: Ashi Pema Choki
- Issue: Dasho Thinley Tobgay; Dasho Ugyen Wangchuck; Ashi Yeshay Choden
- Father: Dasho Pila Gonpo Wangyal
- Mother: Ashi Sonam Pedzom

Wangchuck
- Parent house: —
- Country: Bhutan
- Founded: 17 December 1907 AD
- Founder: Ugyen Wangchuck
- Current head: Jigme Khesar Namgyel Wangchuck
- Titles: Dragon King of Bhutan

Desi Jigme Namgyal of Bhutan (Dzongkha: འཇིགས་མེད་རྣམ་རྒྱལ; Wylie: jigs med rnam rgyal, 1825–1881) is a forefather of the Wangchuck Dynasty. He served as 51st Druk Desi (Deb Raja, the secular executive) of Bhutan (1870–1873), and held the hereditary post of 10th Penlop of Trongsa. He was called the Black Ruler.

== Early life ==
Son of Dasho Pila Gonpo Wangyal and his second wife, Ashi Sonam Pelzom, Desi Jigme Namgyal was born in 1825 at Pila Nagtshang and died in 1881 at Semtokha Dzong. He was an outstanding military commander. The qualities of loyalty, bravery, integrity and risk-taking were crucial factors in the rise of Jigme Namgyal. Desi Jigme Namgyal was from Kurtoe Dungkar, from where the ancestry of Wangchuck Dynasty originates. He was a descendant of Khedrup Kuenga Wangpo (b. 1505), the son of Tertön Pema Lingpa and his second wife, Yum Bumdren, and Khedrup's consort, Wangmo, from Khadro Chodung clan, who was a descendant of Tertön Guru Choewang.

Around 1846, he joined the Trongsa administration that governed eastern Bhutan, which consisted then of the Assam Duars. He rose rapidly through the ranks to become the Trongsa Penlop in 1853.

While he was a high official of Trongsa, Jigme Namgyal married Ashi Pema Choki, the daughter of the 8th Trongsa Penlop (Tamzhing Choji family), Dasho Ugyen Phuntsho, by his wife, Aum Rinchen Pelmo (a daughter of Sonam Drugyel, 31st Druk Desi). His marriage to Pema Choki further enhanced Jigme Namgyal's noble lineage. The ancestry of Jigme Namgyal's wife also went back to Pema Lingpa as she was the daughter of Tamzhing Choji.

Jigme Namgyal and Pema Choki had three children:

- Dasho Thinley Tobgay (b. 1857), 22nd Penlop of Paro.
- Dasho Ugyen Wangchuck, King of Bhutan. Ancestor of King Jigme Khesar Namgyel Wangchuck.
- Ashi Yeshay Choden, wife of Dasho Chimi Dorji, Dzongpon of Thimphu. Ancestor of the following Queens consorts of Bhutan:
  - Phuntsho Choden Wangchuck.
  - Pema Dechen Wangchuck (Phuntsho Choden's younger sister).
  - Jetsun Pema Wangchuck.

== Raven Crown ==
While Jigme Namgyal was the Zimpon (Chamberlain) of Trongsa, he met his root Lama, Jangchub Tsundru. Lama Jangchub Tsundru had a significant influence on him as a spiritual companion. The Lama designed the sacred Raven Crown for Jigme Namgyal. The Raven Crown symbolized the Kings of Bhutan since then.

== Duar Wars 1864–65 ==
As the Trongsa Penlop, from 1853 to 1870, Jigme Namgyal was concerned about the festering tension between British India and Bhutan over the Assam Duars and Bengal Duars, which were the most fertile part of Bhutan in those days. For economic reason, and to secure the borders of their empire, the British attempted to extend their boundaries up to the foothills of Bhutan. The Assam Duars were annexed in 1841 although a formal treaty ceding it did not take place until 1865. In 1864, the British unilaterally declared that, in addition to the Assam Duars that were already annexed, the Bengal Duars would be annexed permanently. Following this, the British sent forces to occupy vital passes into Bhutan such as Deothang, Sidli and Buxa. Jigme Namgyal launched a counter offensive with about 5000 men and succeeded in dislodging the British Imperial Force at Deothang.

He was successful in the January and February 1865 attacks on the British outpost in Deothang. However, later that year Bhutan was forced to sign the Treaty of Sinchula, 1865. The treaty brought stability to the relationship between the two countries. The Duars were incorporated permanently into the British Empire and an annual subsidy of Rs 50,000 to Bhutan was instituted from that year.

== Three legacies of Desi Jigme Namgyal ==
The most important contribution of Desi Jigme Namgyal made was the ushering in of peace, through a reduction of local feuds among the top leadership by gradually unifying the state over three decades, from the 1850s to 1870s. The reduction of internal conflicts, especially after 1878, allowed for laying the foundation of the monarchy that in turn brought a peaceful era in Bhutan.

In terms of external relationship, especially with British India, Desi Jigme Namgyal left an identifiable centre of power that made it possible for treaties to be revised constructively and foreign relationships to be improved over the course of time. His son, the first king of Bhutan, Ugyen Wangchuck amply fulfilled that role later on. After Jigme Namgyal's reign, foreign relations could be conducted in a systematic and co-ordinated way, because the fragmentation of power among the top leadership could be avoided. The Treaty of Sinchula, 1865, which went back to Jigme Namgyal's time, became the crucial, guiding bilateral legal instrument between Bhutan and British India and later, Independent India. It was updated and revised in 1910, 1949, and 2007.

Jigme Namgyel made not only political but architectural impacts. He restored the Tongsa Dzong, and built Sangwa Duepa temple in it. He founded the Wangducholing Palace in Choekhor valley in 1856. Wangducholing Palace was the main residence of the Royal Family from Desi Jigme Namgyal's time to that of the crown prince Jigme Dorji Wangchuck (1929–1972). It was the political epicentre of the country for over a century, from the late 1850s to the early 1950s.

== Death ==
In 1881, Desi Jigme Namgyal died, aged 55–56, at Simtokha Dzong in the Thimphu valley (first built in 1629) from a fall from a yak. His 21-year-old son, then the Paro Penlop, Ugyen Wangchuck (1862–1926), conducted the grandest funeral Bhutan had ever seen for his father.

== Notable descendants ==
Jigme Namgyal is the father of the first Druk Gyalpo King Ugyen Wangchuck, who founded the Bhutanese monarchy in 1907 after besting his rivals, the Penlop of Paro and allies, ending protracted civil war. Jigme Namgyal is thus the forefather of all subsequent Kings of Bhutan: Jigme Wangchuck, Jigme Dorji Wangchuck, Jigme Singye Wangchuck, and Jigme Khesar Namgyel Wangchuck. Several monarchs of the House of Wangchuck have borne Jigme Namgyal's names.

Crown Princes of Bhutan traditionally take the title Penlop of Trongsa (also called "Chhoetse" Penlop), reflecting the hereditary position and historical significance of the office of Jigme Namgyal.

Jigme Namgyel Wangchuck, the current crown prince of Bhutan, is named after him.

== Ancestry ==
Ancestors of Jigme Namgyal (Bhutan)

16. Padma Rigyas
8. Rabgyas
4. Padma
2. Pila Gonpo Wangyal
1. Jigme Namgyal
3. Sonam Pedzom

== See also ==
- Penlop of Trongsa
- History of Bhutan
