= Zhabdrung Rinpoche =

Title used by a great lama; epithet of Ngawang Namgyal

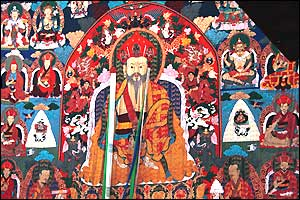
Ngawang Namgyal, the 1st Zhabdrung

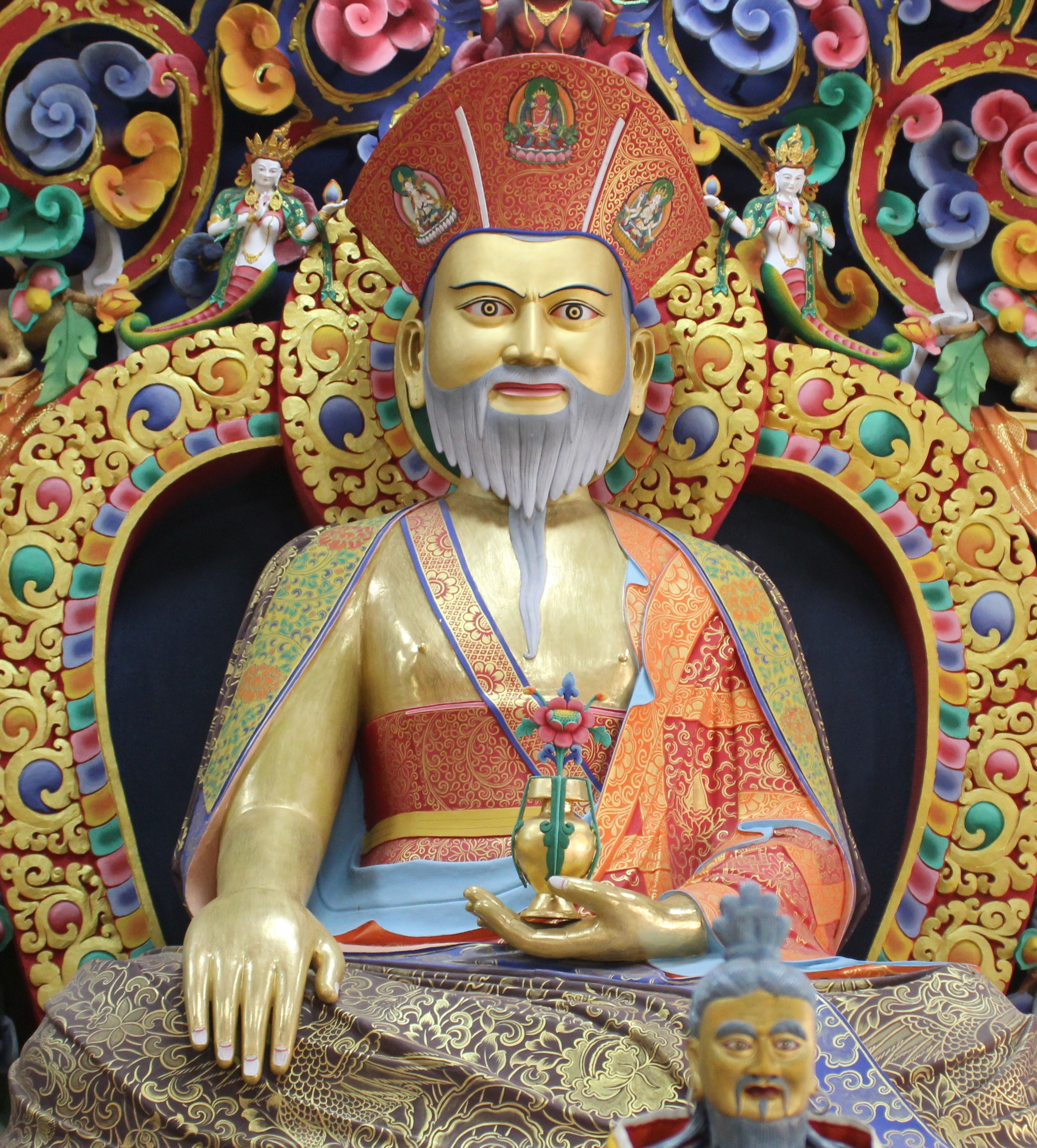
Zhabdrung Rinpoche. Ngawang Namgyal (Statue at Serlung Goenpa) By Som Gyel.

Zhabdrung (also Shabdrung; Tibetan: ཞབས་དྲུང་, Wylie: zhabs-drung; "before the feet of ones submit") was a title used when referring to or addressing great lamas in Tibet, particularly those who held a hereditary lineage. In Bhutan the title almost always refers to Ngawang Namgyal (1594–1651), the founder of the Bhutanese state, or one of his successive reincarnations.

== Ngawang Namgyal ==
The lineage traces through the founder of the country, Ngawang Namgyal, a high Drukpa Lineage lama from Tibet who was the first to unify the warring valley kingdoms under a single rule. He is revered as the third most important figure behind Padmasambhava and Shakyamuni Buddha by the Drukpa Lineage of the Kagyu school of Tibetan Buddhism.

Ngawang Namgyal established the dual system of government under the "Great Tsa Yig" legal code. Under this system, political power was vested in an administrative leader, the Druk Desi, assisted by a collection of local governors or ministers called penlops. A religious leader, the Je Khenpo, held power over monastic affairs. Successive incarnations of the Zhabdrung were to have ultimate authority over both spheres.

However, after the death of Ngawang Namgyal in 1651, power effectively passed to the penlops instead of to a successor Zhabdrung. In order to forestall a dynastic struggle and a return to warlordism, they conspired to keep the death of the Zhabdrung secret for 54 years. During this time they issued orders in his name, explaining that he was on an extended silent retreat.

The passing of the 1st Zhabdrung is modernly celebrated as a Bhutanese national holiday, falling on the 10th day of the 3rd month of the Bhutanese calendar.

== Successor Zhabdrungs ==
Eventually, the ruling authorities in Bhutan were faced with the problem of succession. To neutralize the power of future Zhabdrung incarnations, the Druk Desi, Je Khenpo and penlops conspired to recognize not a single person but rather as three separate persons — a body incarnation (Ku tulku), a mind incarnation (Thu tulku or Thugtrul), and a speech incarnation (Sung tulku or Sungtrul). In spite of their efforts to consolidate the power established by the original Zhabdrung, the country sank into warring factionalism for the next 200 years. The body incarnation lineage died out in the mid-18th century, while the mind and speech incarnations of the Zhabdrung continued into the 20th century. The mind incarnation was the one generally recognized as the Zhabdrung.

Besides the mind incarnation, there was also a line of claimants for the speech incarnation. At the time the monarchy was founded in 1907, Choley Yeshe Ngodub (or Chogley Yeshey Ngodrup) was the speech incarnation and also served as the last Druk Desi. After his death in 1917, he was succeeded by Chogley Jigme Tenzin (1919–1949). The next claimant, unrecognized by the Bhutan government, lived at Tawang monastery in India and was evacuated to the western Himalayas during the 1962 Sino-Indian War.

Another line of claimants to be the mind incarnation of Ngawang Namgyal existed in Tibet, and is now represented by Namkhai Norbu, who resides in Italy.

== Principal reincarnation lineages ==
Lived	Name	Birthplace	Reign
1594—1651	Ngawang Namgyal	Ralung, Tsang, Tibet	1616–1651

=== Zhabdrung Thuktrul ===
"Mind" reincarnations of the Zhabdrung.

	Lived	Name	Birthplace	Reign
		unidentified reincarnation	Göyul, southern Tibet	
0.	1689—1713	Kunga Gyaltshen	Merak Sakteng, eastern Bhutan	
1.	1724—1761	Jigme Drakpa I	Dranang, Tibet	
2.	1762—1788	Chökyi Gyaltsen	Yarlung, Tibet	
3.	1791—1830	Jigme Drakpa II	Bumdeling, eastern Bhutan (now Bumdeling Wildlife Sanctuary)	
4.	1831—1861	Jigme Norbu	Drametse	
5.	1862—1904	Jigme Chögyel	Drametse, eastern Bhutan	
6.	1905—1931	Jigme Dorji	Dakpo Domkar, eastern Bhutan	
7.		???		n/a
8.	1939—1953	Jigme Tendzin Chogay		n/a
9.	1955—2003	Jigme Ngawang Namgyal		n/a
10.	b.2003	Jigme Jigdrel Namgyal		n/a

=== Zhabdrung Sungtrul ===
"Speech" reincarnations of the Zhabdrung.

	Lived	Name	Birthplace	Reign
1.	1706—1734	Chokle Namgyel	Dagana, southern Bhutan	
2.	1735—1775	Shākya Tendzin	Kabe, western Bhutan	
3.	1781—1830	Yeshe Gyeltsen	Thimphu, western Bhutan	1807—1811
4.	1831—1850	Jigme Dorje	Bumthang, central Bhutan	
5.	1851—1917	Yeshe Ngödrup	Bumthang, central Bhutan	
6.	1919—1949	Jigme Tendzin		

== Overthrow and exile ==
In 1907, in an effort to reform the dysfunctional system, the penlops orchestrated the establishment of a Bhutanese monarchy with Ugyen Wangchuck, the penlop of Trongsa, installed as hereditary king, with the support of Britain and against the wishes of Tibet. The royal family suffered from questions of legitimacy in its early years, with the reincarnations of the various Zhabdrungs posing a threat. According to one Drukpa source, the Zhabdrung's brother Chhoki Gyeltshen (who had been to India) challenged the 1926 accession of King Jigme Wangchuck. He was rumored to have met with Mahatma Gandhi to garner support for the Zhabdrung against the king. The 7th Zhabdrung, Jigme Dorji was then "retired" to Talo Monastery and died in 1931, under rumors of assassination. He was the last Zhabdrung recognized by Bhutan; subsequent claimants to the incarnation have not been recognized by the government.

In 1962, Jigme Ngawang Namgyal (known as Zhabdrung Rinpoche to his followers) fled Bhutan for India where he spent the remainder of his life. Up until 2002, Bhutanese pilgrims were able to journey to Kalimpong, just south of Bhutan, to visit him. On April 5, 2003, the Zhabdrung died. Some of his followers claim he was poisoned, while the Bhutanese national newspaper, Kuensel, took pains to explain he died after an extended bout with cancer.

His successor, Jigme Jigdrel Namgyel, was born in 2003.
