= Druk Desi =

Historical title for a civil administrative leader in Bhutan

The Druk Desi (Dzongkha: འབྲུག་སྡེ་སྲིད་, Wylie: 'brug sde-srid; also called Deb Raja) (Note: The original title is Dzongkha: སྡེ་སྲིད་ཕྱག་མཛོད་, Wylie: sde-srid phyag-mdzod.) was the title of the secular (administrative) rulers of Bhutan under the dual system of government between the seventeenth and nineteenth centuries. Under this system, government authority was divided among secular and religious administrations, both unified under the nominal authority of the Zhabdrung Rinpoche. Druk, meaning 'thunder dragon', refers symbolically to Bhutan, whose most ancient name is Druk-yul. Desi, meaning 'regent', was the chief secular office in the realm under this system of government.

== History ==
In Bhutan, the office of Druk Desi was established by the Zhabdrung Rinpoche, Ngawang Namgyal in the 17th century under the dual system of government. Having fled sectarian persecution in Tibet, Ngawang Namgyal established the Drukpa Lineage as the state religion. Under the Bhutanese system, the powers of the government were split between the religious branch headed by the Je Khenpo of the Drukpa Lineage and the civil administrative branch headed by the Druk Desi. Both the Je Khenpo and Druk Desi were under the nominal authority of the Zhabdrung Rinpoche, a reincarnation of Ngawang Namgyal.

The Druk Desi was either a monk or a member of the laity—by the nineteenth century, usually the latter; he was elected for a three-year term, initially by a monastic council and later by the State Council (Lhengye Tshokdu). The State Council was a central administrative organ that included regional rulers, the Zhabdrung's chamberlains, and the Druk Desi. In time, the Druk Desi came under the political control of the State Council's most powerful faction of regional administrators. The Zhabdrung was the head of state and the ultimate authority in religious and civil matters.

The seat of central government was at Thimphu, the site of a thirteenth-century dzong, in the spring, summer, and fall. The winter capital was at Punakha, a dzong established northeast of Thimphu in 1527. The kingdom was divided into three regions (east, central, and west), each with an appointed penlop (governor), holding a seat in a major dzong. Districts were headed by dzongpens (district officers), who had their headquarters in lesser dzongs. The penlops were a combination of tax collectors, judges, military commanders, and procurement agents for the central government. Their major revenues came from the trade between Tibet and India and from land taxes.

It is believed that the death of Ngawang Namgyal in 1651 was concealed for some 50 years as authorities sought his reincarnation as successor. At first the system persisted, however the Druk Desi gradually gained political power and civil wars ensued. Once a reincarnation was found, the Druk Desi was unwilling to part with his acquired power, and the power of the Zhabdrung gradually declined. Similarly, the Druk Desi also lost control over the local rulers and penlops. The country devolved into several semi-independent regions under the control of penlops. In practice, the Zhabdrung was often a child under the control of the Druk Desi, and regional penlops often administered their districts in defiance of the Druk Desi.

The Constitution of Bhutan, enacted in 2008, confirms Bhutan's commitment to the dual system of government. However the title "Druk Desi" never appears in the constitution, and all administrative powers are vested in the Druk Gyalpo and civilian offices directly. Furthermore, the Druk Gyalpo appoints the Je Khenpo on advice of the Five Lopons (learned masters), and the democratic constitution itself is the supreme law of the land, as opposed to a Zhabdrung figurehead.

== See also ==
- List of rulers of Bhutan
- Dual system of government
- History of Bhutan
