= Queen dowager =

Status generally held by the widow of a king

A queen dowager or dowager queen (compare: princess dowager or dowager princess) is a title or status generally held by the widow of a king. In the case of the widow of an emperor, the title of empress dowager is used. Its full meaning is clear from the two words from which it is composed: queen indicates someone who served as queen consort (i.e. wife of a king), while dowager indicates a woman who continues to hold the title from her deceased husband (a queen who reigns in her own right is a queen regnant). A queen mother is the mother of the reigning monarch, who is often also a queen dowager.

As of 2026, there are four queens dowager: Kesang Choden of Bhutan (who is the only living queen grandmother worldwide), Norodom Monineath of Cambodia (who is also queen mother), Lisa Najeeb Halaby (Noor Al'Hussein) of Jordan and Sonja Haraldsen of Norway (who is also queen mother).

== Status ==
A queen dowager has an important royal position (whether or not she is the mother of the reigning sovereign) but does not normally have any rights to succeed a king as monarch on his death unless she happens to be next in line to the throne (one possibility would be if the king and queen were also cousins and childless, the king had no other siblings, and she in her other position as his cousin was also his heiress presumptive).

A queen dowager continues to enjoy the title, style, and precedence of a queen, but is no longer referred to as the queen. A new reigning king would have (at accession or eventually) a wife who would be the new queen consort and therefore the queen; a queen regnant would also be called the queen. Many former queens consort do not formally use the word "dowager" as part of their titles. There may be more than one queen dowager at any given time. The Garter King of Arms's proclamation in the United Kingdom of the styles and titles of Queen Elizabeth the Queen Mother at her funeral on 9 April 2002 illustrates her dual status as a queen dowager and a queen mother:

Thus it hath pleased Almighty God to take out of this transitory life unto His Divine Mercy the late Most High, Most Mighty and Most Excellent Princess Elizabeth, Queen Dowager and Queen Mother, Lady of the Most Noble Order of the Garter, Lady of the Most Ancient and Most Noble Order of the Thistle, Lady of the Imperial Order of the Crown of India, Grand Master and Dame Grand Cross of the Royal Victorian Order upon whom had been conferred the Royal Victorian Chain, Dame Grand Cross of the Most Excellent Order of the British Empire, Dame Grand Cross of the Most Venerable Order of the Hospital of St John, Relict of His Majesty King George the Sixth and Mother of Her Most Excellent Majesty Elizabeth The Second by the Grace of God of the United Kingdom of Great Britain and Northern Ireland and of her other Realms and Territories Queen, Head of the Commonwealth, Defender of the Faith, Sovereign of the Most Noble Order of the Garter, whom may God preserve and bless with long life, health and honour and all worldly happiness.

== Distinction from queen mother ==
A queen mother is a former queen, often a queen dowager, who is the mother of the current monarch. Not every queen mother is a queen dowager, such as Queen Paola of Belgium, who became the queen mother of her son Philippe after her husband Albert II abdicated the throne but retained the title of king. Not all queens dowager are queens mother; they may have a relation other than mother to the reigning monarch, such as aunt or grandmother. For example, Mary, Queen of Scots was queen dowager of France after the death of her husband Francis II, to whom she bore no children. Similarly, Adelaide of Saxe-Meiningen was queen dowager after her husband William IV was succeeded by his niece Victoria.

Not every mother of a reigning monarch is a queen mother or a queen dowager. For example, the mother of Queen Victoria, Princess Victoria of Saxe-Coburg-Saalfeld, was neither queen dowager nor queen mother because her husband, Prince Edward, Duke of Kent and Strathearn, had never been king. Similarly, whilst being the mothers of monarchs, both Princess Augusta of Saxe-Gotha and Srinagarindra of Thailand were not styled queen dowager because their respective husbands, Frederick, Prince of Wales and Mahidol Adulyadej, Prince of Songkla, were never kings. Instead, Augusta held the title of "Dowager Princess of Wales" (a precedent was Henry VII of England's mother, Lady Margaret Beaufort, titled "My Lady the King's Mother"); Srinagarindra meanwhile received the designation "Princess Mother".

As there is only one monarch, there can only be one queen mother. It is possible for there to be a queen mother and one or more queens dowager alive at any one time. This situation occurred in the Commonwealth realms in the period between the accession of Elizabeth II on 6 February 1952 and the death of her paternal grandmother on 24 March 1953, when, for slightly over a year, there were three queens alive:

- Queen Elizabeth II (queen regnant)
- Queen Elizabeth the Queen Mother, widow of the deceased George VI and mother of the reigning queen. Queen Elizabeth, the former queen consort, specifically adopted the appellation queen mother to distinguish herself from her daughter, Queen Elizabeth II. She reportedly loathed being referred to as a dowager queen, and felt there would be confusion if she were called simply by her name, as her two immediate predecessors, Queen Mary and Queen Alexandra, had been.
- Queen Mary, widow of George V and mother of the former king Edward VIII (then Duke of Windsor) and of the late George VI. Queen Mary had been the queen mother from the death of her husband in 1936 until the accession of her granddaughter, Elizabeth II, in 1952. She continued to be titled and styled Her Majesty Queen Mary.

== British queens dowager ==
There were several former queens consort of England, Scotland, and later the United Kingdom, who were never queen mothers. The following queens were dowagers between the given dates, whether queen mothers or not:

Of England:

- Edith of Wessex, wife of Edward the Confessor and sister of Harold Godwinson: 5 January 1066 – 18 December 1075
- Adeliza of Louvain, wife of Henry I, later remarried to William d'Aubigny, 1st Earl of Arundel: 1 December 1135 – 23 April 1151
- Eleanor of Aquitaine, wife of Henry II and queen mother to Richard I and John: 6 July 1189 – 1 April 1204
- Berengaria of Navarre, wife of Richard I: 6 April 1199 – 23 December 1230
- Isabella of Angoulême, wife of John and queen mother to Henry III, later remarried to Hugh X of Lusignan: 18/19 October 1216 – 31 May 1246
- Eleanor of Provence, wife of Henry III and queen mother to Edward I: 16 November 1272 – 24 June 1291
- Marguerite of France, wife of Edward I and stepmother of Edward II: 7 July 1307 – 14 February 1317
- Isabella of France, wife of Edward II and queen mother to Edward III: September 1327 – 22 August 1358
- Isabella of Valois, wife of Richard II, later remarried to Charles I, Duke of Orléans: 14 February 1399 – 13 September 1409
- Joanna of Navarre, wife of Henry IV and stepmother of Henry V: 20 March 1413 – 9 July 1437
- Catherine of Valois, wife of Henry V and queen mother to Henry VI, later remarried to Owen Tudor: 31 August 1422 – 3 January 1437
- Margaret of Anjou, wife of Henry VI: 21 May 1471 – 25 August 1482
- Elizabeth Woodville, wife of Edward IV and queen mother to Edward V: 9 April 1483 – 8 June 1492

Of England and Ireland:

- Catherine Parr, sixth wife of Henry VIII and stepmother of Edward VI, Mary I and Elizabeth I, later remarried to Thomas Seymour, 1st Baron Seymour of Sudeley: 28 January 1547 – 5 September 1548

Of Scotland:

- Margaret of Wessex, wife of Malcolm III: 13 November 1093 – 16 November 1093
- Ermengarde de Beaumont, wife of William I and queen mother to Alexander II: 4 December 1214 – 12 February 1233/34
- Marie de Coucy, wife of Alexander II and queen mother to Alexander III, later remarried to Jean de Brienne: 6 July 1249 – 1285
- Yolande of Dreux, wife of Alexander III, later remarried to Arthur II of Brittany: 19 March 1286 – 2 August 1322
- Joan Beaufort, wife of James I and queen mother to James II, later remarried to James Stewart: 21 February 1437 – 15 July 1445
- Mary of Guelders, wife of James II and queen mother to James III: 3 August 1460 – 1 December 1463
- Margaret Tudor, wife of James IV and queen mother to James V, later remarried to Archibald Douglas, 6th Earl of Angus and Henry Stewart, 1st Lord Methven: 9 September 1513 – 8 October 1541
- Mary of Guise, wife of James V and queen mother to Mary, Queen of Scots: 14 December 1542 – 11 June 1560

Of England, Ireland and Scotland:

- Henrietta Maria of France, wife of Charles I and queen mother to Charles II: 30 January 1649 – 10 September 1669
- Catherine of Braganza, wife of Charles II: 6 February 1685 – 30 November 1705
- Mary of Modena, wife of James II and VII: 16 September 1701 – 7 May 1718

Of the United Kingdom:

- Adelaide of Saxe-Meiningen, wife of William IV: 20 June 1837 – 2 December 1849
- Alexandra of Denmark, wife of Edward VII and queen mother to George V: 6 May 1910 – 20 November 1925
- Mary of Teck, wife of George V and queen mother to Edward VIII and George VI: 20 January 1936 – 24 March 1953
- Elizabeth Bowes-Lyon, wife of George VI and queen mother to Elizabeth II: 6 February 1952 – 30 March 2002 (styled as Queen Elizabeth The Queen Mother)

If the current queen consort, Queen Camilla, outlives the incumbent king, Charles III, she will become a queen dowager, while King Charles' son and daughter-in-law become the new king and queen consort, respectively. She would not be known as a queen mother, as she is not the biological parent of Prince William.

== List ==
Note that in some of the countries mentioned below it is unusual to indicate a former queen consort as a dowager.

=== Africa ===
==== Lesotho ====
- 'Mamohato Bereng Seeiso, wife of Moshoeshoe II

=== East Asia ===
==== China ====
Warring States
- Queen Dowager Xuan, concubine of King Xiaowen and mother of King Zhaoxiang (Qin)
- Queen Dowager Zhao, wife of King Zhuangxiang (Qin)

Han dynasty

- Empress Gao (Lü Zhi), wife of Emperor Gaozu
- Empress Dowager Bo, concubine of Emperor Gaozu and mother of Emperor Wen
- Empress Xiaowen (Dou Yifang), second wife of Emperor Wen
- Empress Xiaoyuan (Wang Zhengjun), wife of Emperor Yuan
- Empress Mingde, wife of Emperor Ming
- Empress Hexi (Deng Sui), second wife of Emperor He
- Empress Shunlie (Liang Na), wife of Emperor Shun
- Empress Huansi (Dou Miao), third wife of Emperor Huan

Three Kingdoms

- Empress Dowager Bian, wife of Cao Cao and mother of Emperor Wen (Cao Wei)
- Empress Wende (Guo Nüwang), second wife of Emperor Wen (Cao Wei)
- Empress Mu (Wu Xian), wife of Emperor Zhaolie (Shu Han)

Jin dynasty

- Empress Wenming (Wang Yuanji), wife of Sima Zhao and mother of Emperor Wu
- Empress Wudao (Yang Zhi), second wife of Emperor Wu
- Empress Kangxian (Chu Suanzi), wife of Emperor Kang

Tang dynasty

- Wu Zetian, concubine of Emperor Taizong, wife of Emperor Gaozong and mother of Emperor Zhongzong and Emperor Ruizong of Tang; later became the only female emperor in the history of China

Qing dynasty

- Empress Dowager Cixi, concubine of the Xianfeng Emperor and mother of the Tongzhi Emperor

==== Japan ====
- Empress Dowager Eishō, wife of Emperor Kōmei
- Empress Shōken, wife of Emperor Meiji
- Empress Teimei, wife of Emperor Taishō and mother of Emperor Shōwa
- Empress Nagako, wife of Emperor Shōwa and mother of Emperor Akihito

==== Korea ====
- Queen Heonae, third wife of King Gyeongjong, daughter of King Gwangjong, sister of King Seongjong and mother of King Mokjong of Goryeo
- Queen Gongye, third wife of King Injong and mother of King Uijong, King Myeongjong and King Sinjong of Goryeo
- Queen Jangnyeol, second wife of King Injo, stepmother of King Hyojong, step-grandmother of King Hyeonjong and step-great-grandmother of King Sukjong of Joseon
- Queen Jeongsun, second wife of King Yeongjo, step-grandmother of King Jeongjo and step-great-grandmother of King Sunjo of Joseon

=== Europe ===
==== Aragon ====
- Sancha of Castile, wife of Alfonso II
- Constance II of Sicily, wife of Peter III
- Elisenda of Montcada, fourth wife of James II
- Eleanor of Castile, second wife of Alfonso IV
- Violant of Bar, second wife of John I
- Eleanor of Alburquerque, wife of Ferdinand I

==== Bavaria ====
- Caroline of Baden, second wife of Maximilian I Joseph
- Marie of Prussia, wife of Maximilian II

==== Bohemia ====
- Świętosława of Poland, third wife of Vratislaus I
- Judith of Thuringia, second wife of Vladislaus I
- Constance of Hungary, second wife of Ottokar I
- Kunigunda of Halych, second wife of Ottokar II
- Elizabeth Richeza of Poland, second wife of Wenceslaus II and Rudolf I
- Viola of Teschen, wife of Wenceslaus III
- Beatrice of Bourbon, second wife of John
- Elizabeth of Pomerania, fourth wife of Charles I
- Sophia of Bavaria, second wife of Wenceslaus IV
- Barbara of Cilli, second wife of Sigismund
- Elizabeth of Luxembourg, wife of Albert
- Joanna of Rožmitál, second wife of George
- Mary of Austria, wife of Louis II
- Maria of Austria, wife of Maximilian
- Eleonora Gonzaga, second wife of Ferdinand II
- Eleonora Gonzaga, third wife of Ferdinand III
- Eleonore Magdalene of Neuburg, third wife of Leopold I
- Wilhelmine Amalie of Brunswick-Lüneburg, wife of Joseph I
- Elisabeth Christine of Brunswick-Wolfenbüttel, wife of Charles II
- Maria Luisa of Spain, wife of Leopold II
- Caroline Augusta of Bavaria, fourth wife of Francis I
- Maria Anna of Savoy, wife of Ferdinand V

==== Bulgaria ====
- Giovanna of Savoy, wife of Boris III

==== Castile ====
- Eleanor of England, wife of Alfonso VIII and mother of Henry I and Berengaria
- Constance of Portugal, wife of Ferdinand IV and mother of Alfonso XI
- Maria of Portugal, second wife of Alfonso XI and mother of Peter
- Isabella of Portugal, second wife of John II and mother of Isabella I

==== Croatia ====
- Helen of Zadar, wife of Michael Krešimir II

==== Denmark ====
- Jutta of Saxony, wife of Eric IV
- Matilda of Holstein, wife of Abel
- Margaret Sambiria, wife of Christopher I
- Agnes of Brandenburg, wife of Eric V
- Dorothea of Brandenburg, wife of Christopher III and Christian I
- Christina of Saxony, wife of Hans
- Sophie of Pomerania, second wife of Frederick I
- Dorothea of Saxe-Lauenburg, wife of Christian III
- Sophie of Mecklenburg-Güstrow, wife of Frederick II
- Sophie Amalie of Brunswick-Calenberg, wife of Frederick III
- Charlotte Amalie of Hesse-Kassel, wife of Christian V
- Anne Sophie Reventlow, third wife of Frederick IV
- Sophie Magdalene of Brandenburg-Kulmbach, wife of Christian VI
- Juliana Maria of Brunswick-Wolfenbüttel, second wife of Frederick V
- Marie of Hesse-Kassel, wife of Frederick VI
- Caroline Amalie of Augustenburg, second wife of Christian VIII
- Louise of Sweden, wife of Frederick VIII
- Alexandrine of Mecklenburg-Schwerin, wife of Christian X
- Ingrid of Sweden, wife of Frederik IX

==== Etruria ====
- Maria Luisa of Spain, wife of Louis I

==== France ====
- Judith of Bavaria, second wife of Louis the Pious
- Richilde of Provence, second wife of Charles the Bald
- Adelaide of Paris, second wife of Louis the Stammerer
- Théodrate of Troyes, wife of Odo
- Eadgifu of Wessex, second wife of Charles the Simple
- Beatrice of Vermandois, second wife of Robert I
- Gerberga of Saxony, wife of Louis IV of France
- Emma of Italy, wife of Lothair
- Adelaide of Aquitaine, wife of Hugh Capet
- Constance of Arles, third wife of Robert II
- Anne of Kiev, second wife Henry I
- Bertrade of Montfort, second wife of Philip I
- Adelaide of Maurienne, second wife of Louis VI
- Adela of Champagne, third wife of Louis VII
- Ingeborg of Denmark, second wife of Philip II
- Blanche of Castile, wife of Louis VIII
- Margaret of Provence, wife of Louis IX
- Marie of Brabant, second wife of Philip III
- Clementia of Hungary, second wife Louis X
- Joan II of Burgundy, wife of Philip V
- Joan of Évreux, third wife of Charles IV
- Blanche of Navarre, second wife of Philip VI
- Isabeau of Bavaria, wife of Charles VI
- Marie of Anjou, wife of Charles VII
- Charlotte of Savoy, second wife of Louis XI
- Anne of Brittany, wife of Charles VIII
- Mary Tudor, third wife of Louis XII
- Eleanor of Austria, second wife of Francis I
- Catherine de' Medici, wife of Henry II
- Mary, Queen of Scots, wife of Francis II
- Elisabeth of Austria, wife Charles IX
- Louise of Lorraine, wife of Henry III
- Marie de' Medici, second wife of Henry IV
- Anne of Austria, wife of Louis XIII

==== Greece ====
- Olga Constantinovna of Russia, wife of George I
- Sophia of Prussia, wife of Constantine I
- Frederica of Hanover, wife of Paul

==== Hungary ====
- Giselle of Bavaria, wife of Stephen I
- Anastasia of Kiev, wife of Andrew I
- Richeza of Poland, wife of Béla I
- Synadene, second wife of Géza I
- Helena of Serbia, wife of Béla II
- Euphrosyne of Kiev, wife of Géza II
- Agnes of Austria, wife of Stephen III
- Maria Komnene, wife of Stephen IV
- Margaret of France, second wife of Béla III
- Constance of Aragon, wife of Emeric
- Beatrice d'Este, third wife of Andrew II
- Maria Laskarina, wife of Béla IV
- Elizabeth the Cuman, wife of Stephen V
- Elizabeth of Sicily, wife of Ladislaus IV
- Agnes of Austria, second wife of Andrew III
- Elizabeth of Poland, third wife of Charles I
- Elizabeth of Bosnia, second wife of Louis I
- Margaret of Durazzo, wife of Charles II
- Barbara of Cilli, second wife of Sigismund
- Elizabeth of Luxembourg, wife of Albert I
- Beatrice of Naples, third wife of Matthias I
- Mary of Austria, wife of Louis II
- Isabella Jagiellon, wife of John I
- Maria of Austria, wife of Maximilian
- Eleonora Gonzaga, second wife of Ferdinand II
- Eleonora Gonzaga, third wife of Ferdinand III
- Eleonore Magdalene of Neuburg, third wife of Leopold I
- Wilhelmine Amalie of Brunswick-Lüneburg, wife of Joseph I
- Elisabeth Christine of Brunswick-Wolfenbüttel, wife of Charles III
- Maria Luisa of Spain, wife of Leopold II
- Caroline Augusta of Bavaria, fourth wife of Francis I
- Maria Anna of Savoy, wife of Ferdinand V

==== Italy ====
- Margherita of Savoy, wife of Umberto I

==== León ====
- Urraca of Portugal, first wife of Ferdinand II and mother of Alfonso IX
- Teresa of Portugal, first wife of Alfonso IX
- Constance of Portugal, wife of Fernando IV and mother of Alfonso XI
- Maria of Portugal, second wife of Alfonso XI and mother of Peter I
- Isabella of Portugal, second wife of John II and mother of Isabella I
- Joan of Portugal, second wife of Henry IV

==== Naples ====
- Margaret of Burgundy, second wife of Charles I
- Mary of Hungary, wife of Charles II
- Sancia of Majorca, second wife of Robert
- Margaret of Durazzo, wife of Charles III
- Mary of Enghien, third wife of Ladislaus
- Joanna of Aragon, second wife of Ferdinand I
- Joanna of Naples, wife of Ferdinand II
- Isabella del Balzo, second wife of Frederick
- Germaine of Foix, second wife of Ferdinand III
- Mariana of Austria, second wife of Philip III
- Maria Anna of Neuburg, second wife of Charles V

==== Navarre ====
- Urraca of Castile, second wife of García Ramírez
- Margaret of Bourbon, third wife of Theobald I
- Isabella of France, wife of Theobald II
- Blanche of Artois, wife of Henry I
- Clementia of Hungary, second wife of Louis I
- Joan II of Burgundy, wife of Philip II
- Joan of Évreux, third wife of Charles I
- Marie de' Medici, second wife of Henry III

==== Norway ====
- Ingrid Ragnvaldsdotter, wife of Harald IV
- Margaret of Sweden, wife of Sverre
- Margaret Skulesdatter, wife of Haakon IV
- Ingeborg of Denmark, wife of Magnus VI
- Isabel Bruce, second wife of Eric II
- Margaret I of Denmark, wife of Haakon VI
- Dorothea of Brandenburg, wife of Christopher and Christian I
- Christina of Saxony, wife of Hans
- Sophie of Pomerania, second wife of Frederick I
- Dorothea of Saxe-Lauenburg, wife of Christian III
- Sophie of Mecklenburg-Güstrow, wife of Frederick II
- Sophie Amalie of Brunswick-Calenberg, wifr of Frederick III
- Charlotte Amalie of Hesse-Kassel, wife of Christian V
- Anne Sophie Reventlow, third wife of Frederick IV
- Sophie Magdalene of Brandenburg-Kulmbach, wife of Christian VI
- Juliana Maria of Brunswick-Wolfenbüttel, second wife of Frederick V
- Hedvig Elisabeth Charlotte of Holstein-Gottorp, wife of Charles II
- Désirée Clary, wife of Charles III John
- Josephine of Leuchtenberg, wife of Oscar I
- Sonja Haraldsen, wife of Harald V

==== Portugal ====
- Beatrice of Castile, second wife of Afonso III and mother of Denis
- Elizabeth of Aragon, wife of Denis and mother of Afonso IV
- Beatrice of Castile, wife of Afonso IV and mother of Peter I
- Leonor Teles, wife of Ferdinand I
- Eleanor of Aragon, wife of Edward and mother of Afonso V
- Eleanor of Viseu, wife of John II
- Eleanor of Austria, third wife of Manuel I
- Catherine of Austria, wife of John III and grandmother of Sebastian
- Luisa de Guzmán, wife of John IV and mother of Afonso VI and Peter II
- Maria Anna of Austria, wife of John V and mother of Joseph I
- Mariana Victoria of Spain, wife of Joseph I and mother of Maria I
- Carlota Joaquina of Spain, wife of John VI and mother of Pedro IV and Miguel I
- Maria Pia of Savoy, wife of Luís I and mother of Carlos I
- Amélie of Orléans, wife of Carlos I and mother of King Manuel II

==== Prussia ====
- Sophia Louise of Mecklenburg-Schwerin, third wife of Frederick I
- Sophia Dorothea of Hanover, wife of Frederick William I
- Elisabeth Christine of Brunswick-Wolfenbüttel-Bevern, wife of Frederick II
- Frederica Louisa of Hesse-Darmstadt, second wife of Frederick William II
- Elisabeth Ludovika of Bavaria, wife of Frederick William IV
- Augusta of Saxe-Weimar-Eisenach, wife of Wilhelm I
- Victoria, Princess Royal, wife of Frederick III

==== Romania ====
- Elisabeth of Wied, wife of Carol I
- Marie of Edinburgh, wife of Ferdinand I

==== Sardinia ====
- Maria Theresa of Austria-Este, wife of Victor Emmanuel I
- Maria Cristina of Naples and Sicily, wife of Charles Felix
- Maria Theresa of Austria, wife of Charles Albert

==== Saxony ====
- Amalie of Zweibrücken-Birkenfeld, wife of Frederick Augustus I
- Maria Anna of Bavaria, second wife of Frederick Augustus II
- Amalie Auguste of Bavaria, wife of John
- Carola of Vasa, wife of Albert

==== Sicily ====
- Beatrice of Rethel, third wife of Roger II
- Margaret of Navarre, wife of William I
- Joan of England, wife of William II
- Sibylla of Acerra, wife of Tancred
- Elisabeth of Bavaria, wife of Conrad I
- Helena Angelina Doukaina, second wife of Manfred
- Eleanor of Anjou, wife of Frederick III
- Elizabeth of Carinthia, wife of Peter II
- Blanche I of Navarre, second wife of Martin I
- Margaret of Prades, second wife of Martin II
- Eleanor of Alburquerque, wife of Ferdinand I
- Germaine of Foix, second wife of Ferdinand II
- Mariana of Austria, second wife of Philip III
- Maria Anna of Neuburg, second wife of Charles III

==== Spain ====
- Mariana of Austria, second wife of Philip IV
- Maria Anna of Neuburg, second wife of Charles II
- Louise Élisabeth d'Orléans, wife of Louis I
- Elisabeth Farnese, second wife of Philip V
- Maria Christina of the Two Sicilies, fourth wife of Ferdinand VII
- Maria Christina of Austria, second wife of Alfonso XII

==== Sweden ====
In Sweden, there has also been another title for a dowager queen, called Riksänkedrottning, which means Queen Dowager of the Realm. This title was used in the 16th and 17th centuries. The last use of the queen dowager title was in 1913.

- Helvig of Holstein, wife of Magnus III
- Christina Abrahamsdotter, third wife of Charles VIII
- Catherine Stenbock, third wife of Gustav I
- Gunilla Bielke, second wife of John III
- Christina of Holstein-Gottorp, second wife of Charles IX
- Maria Eleonora of Brandenburg, wife of Gustavus Adolphus
- Hedwig Eleonora of Holstein-Gottorp, wife of Charles X Gustav
- Louisa Ulrika of Prussia, wife of Adolph Frederick
- Sophia Magdalena of Denmark, wife of Gustav III
- Hedvig Elisabeth Charlotte of Holstein-Gottorp, wife of Charles XIII
- Désirée Clary, wife of Charles XIV John
- Josephine of Leuchtenberg, wife of Oscar I
- Sophia of Nassau, wife of Oscar II

==== Two Sicilies ====
- María Isabel of Spain, second wife of Francis I
- Maria Theresa of Austria, second wife of Ferdinand II

==== Württemberg ====
- Charlotte, Princess Royal, second wife of Frederick I
- Pauline Therese of Württemberg, third wife of William I and mother of Charles I
- Olga Nikolaevna of Russia, wife of Charles I

==== Yugoslavia ====
- Maria of Romania, wife of Alexander I

=== Pacific ===
==== Hawaii ====
- Kaʻahumanu, wife of Kamehameha I
- Emma Rooke, wife of Kamehameha IV

==== Tonga ====
- ʻAnaseini Takipō, second wife of George Tupou II
- Halaevalu Mataʻaho ʻAhomeʻe, wife of Tāufaʻāhau Tupou IV

=== South America ===
==== Brazil ====
- Amélie of Leuchtenberg, second wife of Pedro I

=== South Asia ===
==== Bhutan ====
- Phuntsho Choden, first wife of Jigme Wangchuck
- Pema Dechen, second wife of Jigme Wangchuck
- Kesang Choden, wife of Jigme Dorji Wangchuck

==== Nepal ====
- Rajendra Rajya Laxmi Devi, wife of Pratap Singh Shah
- Tripurasundari, fourth wife of Rana Bahadur Shah
- Gorakshya Rajya Lakshmi Devi, second wife of Girvan Yuddha Bikram Shah
- Rajya Lakshmi Devi, second wife of Rajendra Bikram Shah
- Divyeshwari, second wife of Prithvi Bir Bikram Shah
- Kanti Rajya Lakshmi Devi Shah, first wife of Tribhuvan
- Ishwari Rajya Lakshmi Devi Shah, second wife of Tribhuvan
- Ratna Rajya Lakshmi Devi Shah, second wife of Mahendra

=== Southeast Asia ===
==== Malaysia ====
- Raja Perempuan Zainab II, first wife of Yahya Petra of Kelantan
- Raja Perempuan Tengku Anis, first wife of Ismail Petra of Kelantan
- Tunku Puan Nora, second wife of Ismail of Johor
- Tunku Puan Zanariah, second wife of Iskandar of Johor
- Raja Permaisuri Tuanku Bainun, wife of Azlan Shah of Perak
- Tengku Ampuan Jemaah, first wife of Hisamuddin of Selangor
- Permaisuri Siti Aishah, fifth wife of Salahuddin of Selangor
- Che Puan Besar Haminah, second wife of Abdul Halim of Kedah
- Che Puan Besar Kalsom Abdullah, second wife of Ahmad Shah of Pahang
- Tengku Ampuan Tua Intan Zaharah, second wife of Ismail Nasiruddin of Terengganu
- Tengku Ampuan Bariah, first wife of Mahmud of Terengganu
- Raja Perempuan Budriah, first wife of Putra of Perlis

==== Myanmar ====
- Yun San, consort of Alaungpaya and mother of Naungdawgyi, Hsinbyushin and Bodawpaya
- Laungshe Mibaya, consort of Mindon Min and mother of Thibaw Min

==== Thailand ====
- Amarindra, wife of Rama I and mother of Rama II
- Sri Suriyendra, wife of Rama II and mother of Mongkut and Pinklao
- Saovabha Phongsri, wife of Chulalongkorn, daughter of Mongkut and mother of Vajiravudh and Prajadhipok
- Savang Vadhana, wife of Chulalongkorn, daughter of Mongkut and grandmother of Ananda Mahidol and Bhumibol Adulyadej
- Sukhumala Marasri, wife of Chulalongkorn and daughter of Mongkut
- Rambai Barni, wife of Prajadhipok
- Sirikit, wife of Bhumibol Adulyadej and mother of Vajiralongkorn

=== West Asia ===
==== Iraq ====
- Huzaima bint Nasser, wife of Faisal I and mother of Ghazi
- Aliya bint Ali, wife of Ghazi and mother of Faisal II

==== Jordan ====
- Musbah bint Nasser, first wife of Abdullah I and mother of Talal
- Zein al-Sharaf bint Jamil, wife of Talal and mother of Hussein
- Lisa Najeeb Halaby (Noor Al Hussein), fourth wife of Hussein and stepmother of the current king, Abdullah II

== Fiction ==
In the novel series The Princess Diaries, the character Princess Clarisse Marie Grimaldi Renaldo is the princess dowager of the principality of Genovia. In the films, where Genovia is portrayed as a kingdom, Clarisse is portrayed as a queen dowager.

In the fantasy novel series A Song of Ice and Fire, and later the HBO series Game of Thrones, the character Cersei Lannister became the queen mother to Joffrey Baratheon after her husband Robert Baratheon was killed in a hunting accident, although she managed to strong-arm the position of regent as well, and was thus known as the queen regent. In the episode "High Sparrow", the new queen consort, Margaery Tyrell, mocks Cersei's loss of power by asking her to clarify whether she should be addressed as queen mother or queen dowager.

In the 2015 Indian movie Baahubali: The Beginning and its sequel Baahubali: The Conclusion, actress Ramya Krishnan portrays the character "Rajamatha Shivagami Devi". In most Indian languages, the word "rajamata" means queen mother.

In the video game Long Live the Queen, after the queen regnant of the kingdom of Nova is assassinated, her widower is referred to as the king dowager.

In the 2023 Netflix series Queen Charlotte: A Bridgerton Story, actress Michelle Fairley portrays Augusta, Dowager Princess of Wales, King George's mother.
