= List of rulers of Bhutan =

King of Bhutan
- Emblem of Bhutan

Incumbent
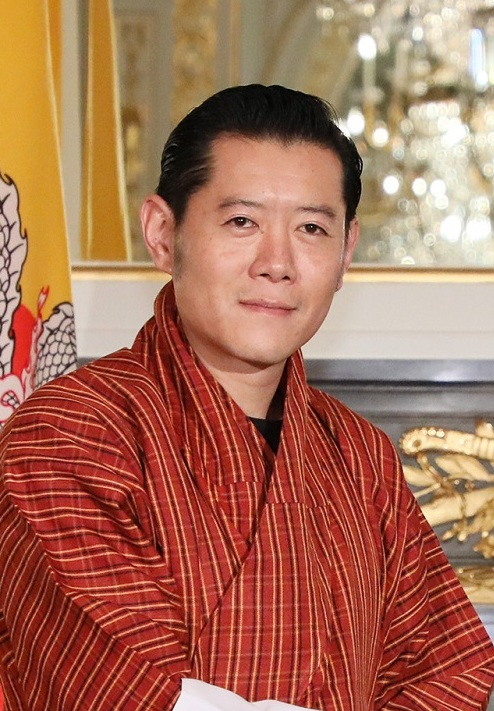
- Jigme Khesar Namgyel Wangchuck since 9 December 2006
- 5th Dragon King (Druk Gyalpo)

Details
- Style: His Majesty
- Heir presumptive: Jigme Namgyel Wangchuck
- First monarch: Ugyen Wangchuck
- Formed: 17 December 1907; 118 years ago
- Residences: Samteling Palace, Thimphu

Bhutan was founded and unified as a country by Ngawang Namgyal, 1st Zhabdrung Rinpoche in the mid–17th century. After his death in 1651, Bhutan nominally followed his recommended "Dual System of Government". Under the dual system, government control was split between a secular leader, the Druk Desi (འབྲུག་སྡེ་སྲིད་, a.k.a. Deb Raja); (Note: The original title is སྡེ་སྲིད་ཕྱག་མཛོད་; desi chhak zod.) and a religious leader, the Je Khenpo (རྗེ་མཁན་པོ་).

Both the Druk Desi and Je Khenpo were under the nominal authority of the Zhabdrung Rinpoche, a reincarnation of Ngawang Namgyal. In practice however, the Zhabdrung was often a child under the control of the Druk Desi, and regional penlops often administered their districts in defiance of the power of the Druk Desis until the rise of the unified Wangchuck dynasty in 1907.

Since the rise of the unified Wangchuck family in 1907, the Druk Gyalpo (འབྲུག་རྒྱལ་པོ་; lit. "Dragon King") have been the head of state of the Kingdom of Bhutan.

== Druk Desis (1650–1905) ==
Below appears the list of Druk Desis throughout the existence of the office. Officeholders were initially appointed by Zhabdrung Ngawang Namgyal, though after his death the Je Khenpo and civil government decided appointments.

Italics indicate coregencies and caretaker governments, which are not traditionally separately numbered.

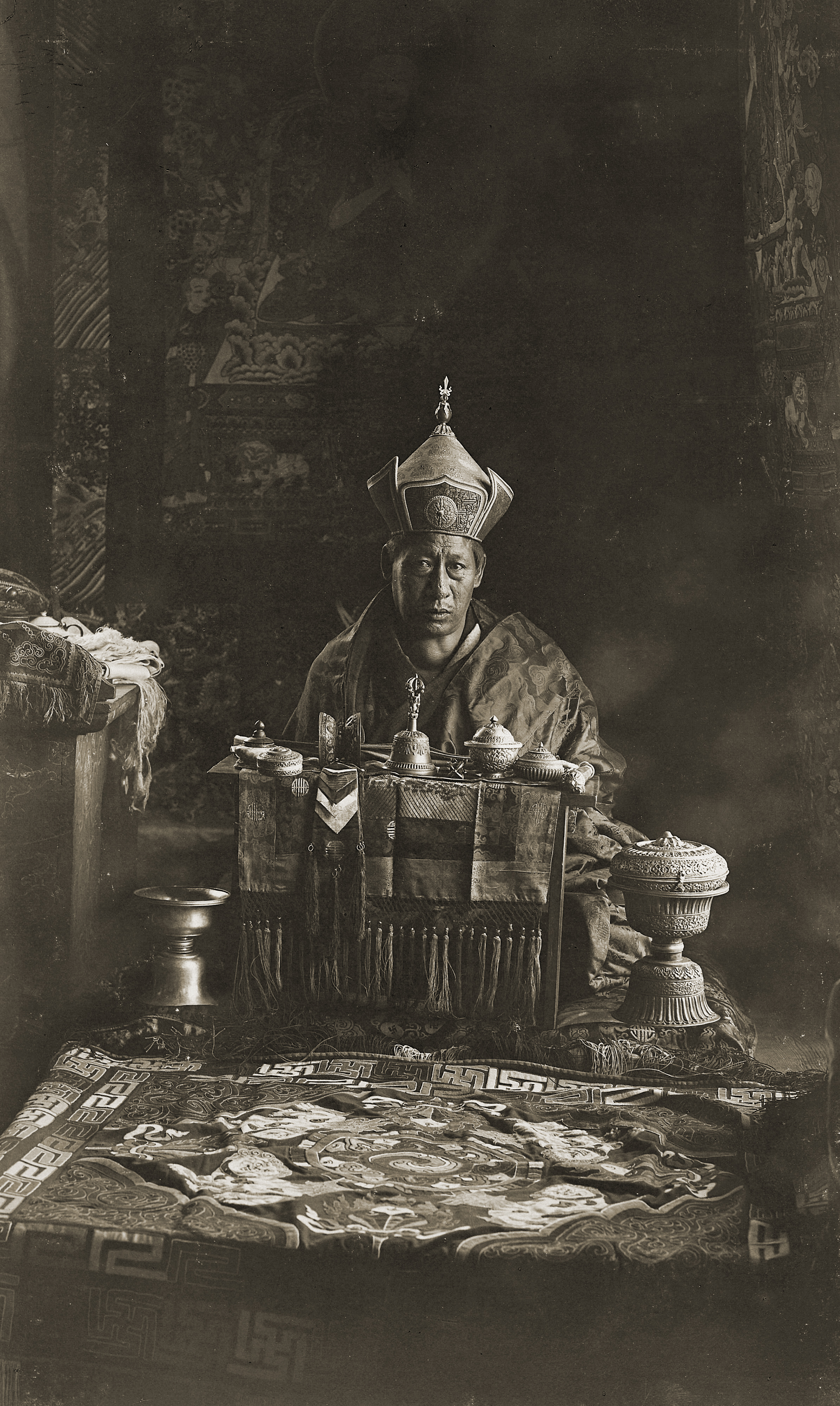
A photo of the 54th Druk Desi, Choley Yeshe Ngodub.

Druk Desis of Bhutan
No.	Name	Date of birth	Reign start	Reign end	Date of death
1	Tenzin Drukgye	1591	1650	1655	1655
2	Langonpa Tenzin Drukdra		1655	1667	1667
3	Chhogyel Minjur Tempa	1613	1667	1680	1680
4	Gyalsey Tenzin Rabgye	1638	1680	1694	1696
5	Gedun Chomphel		1695	1701	1701
6	Ngawang Tshering		1701	1704	
7	Umze Peljor		1704	1707	1707
8	Druk Rabgye		1707	1719	1729
9	Ngawang Gyamtsho		1719	1729	1729
10	Mipham Wangpo		1729	1736	
11	Khuwo Peljor		1736	1739	
12	Ngawang Gyaltshen		1739	1744	
13	Sherab Wangchuk		1744	1763	
14	Druk Phuntsho		1763	1765	
15	Wangzob Druk Tenzin I		1765	1768	
16	Sonam Lhundub (Note: Druk Desi Sonam Lhundub was the first Bhutanese ruler to confront British power, losing in a power bid in Cooch Behar, a traditional Bhutanese dependency.)		1768	1773	1773
17	Kunga Rinchen		1773	1776	
18	Jigme Singye	1742	1776	1788	1789
19	Druk Tenzin		1788	1792	
20	Umzey Chapchhab		1792	1792	1792
21	Chhogyel Sonam Gyaltshen (Tashi Namgyel)		1792	1799	
22	Druk Namgyel		1799	1803	
23	Chhogyel Sonam Gyaltshen (Tashi Namgyel) (2nd reign)		1803	1805	
24	Sangye Tenzin		1805	1806	
25	Umzey Parob		1806	1808	
26	Byop Chhyoda		1807	1808	
27	Tulku Tsulthrim Daba	1790	1809	1810	1820
28	Zhabdrung Thutul (Jigme Dragpa)		1810	1811	
29	Chholay Yeshey Gyaltshen	1781	1811	1815	1830
30	Tshaphu Dorji Namgyel		1815	1815	
31	Sonam Drugyel		1815	1819	
32	Gongzim Tenzin Drukda		1819	1823	
33	Chhoki Gyaltshen		1823	1831	
34	Dorji Namgyal		1831	1832	
35	Adab Thinley		1832	1835	
36	Chhoki Gyaltshen (2nd reign)		1835	1838	
37	Dorji Norbu		1838	1850	
38	Wangchuk Gyalpo		1850	1850	
39	Zhabdrung Thutul (Jigme Norbu) (in Thimphu)		1850	1852	
39	Chagpa Sangye (in Punakha)		1851	1852	
40	Damchho Lhundrup		1852	1854	
41	Jamtul Jamyang Tenzin		1854	1856	
42	Kunga Palden (in Punakha)		1856	1860	
42	Sherab Tharchin (in Thimphu)		1856	1860	
43	Phuntsho Namgyel (Nazi Pasang)		1860	1863	
44	Tshewang Sithub		1863	1864	
44	Tsulthrim Yonten		1864	1864	
45	Kagyud Wangchuk		1864	1864	
46	Tshewang Sithub (2nd reign)		1865	1867	
47	Tsondul Pekar		1867	1870	
48	Jigme Namgyel	1825	1870	1873	1881
49	Kitshab Dorji Namgyel		1873	1879	
49	Jigme Namgyel (2nd reign)		1877	1878	
49	Kitshab Dorji Namgyel (2nd reign)		1878	1879	
50	Chhogyel Zangpo		March 1879	June 1880	1880
50	Jigme Namgyel (3rd reign)		June 1880	July 1881	
51	Lam Tshewang	1836	July 1881	May 1883	1883
52	Gawa Zangpo		May 1883	August 1885	
53	Sangay Dorji		1885	1901	1901
54	Choley Yeshe Ngodub	1851	1903	1905	1917

== Kings of Bhutan (1907–present) ==
The Bhutanese monarchy was established on 17 December 1907, unifying the country under the control of the Wangchuck dynasty, hereditary penlops (governors) of Trongsa Province. The King of Bhutan, formally known as the Druk Gyalpo ("Dragon King"), also occupies the office of Druk Desi under the "Dual System of Government". Since the enactment of the Constitution of 2008, the Druk Gyalpo has remained head of state, while the Prime Minister of Bhutan acts as executive and head of government in a parliamentary democracy under a constitutional monarchy.

Name	Lifespan	Reign start	Reign end	Notes	Family	Image
Ugyen: 1st Druk Gyalpo; ཨོ་རྒྱན་དབང་ཕྱུག	11 June 1862 – 26 August 1926 (aged 64)	17 December 1907	26 August 1926	Son of Jigme Namgyal	Wangchuck	Ugyen Wangchuck of Bhutan
Jigme: 2nd Druk Gyalpo; འཇིགས་མེད་དབང་ཕྱུག	1905 – 30 March 1952 (aged 46–47)	26 August 1926	30 March 1952	Son of Ugyen	Wangchuck	Jigme Wangchuck of Bhutan
Jigme Dorji: 3rd Druk Gyalpo; འབྲུག་རྒྱལ་པོ་ འཇིགས་མེད་རྡོ་རྗེ་དབང་ཕྱུག་མཆོག་	2 May 1928 – 21 July 1972 (aged 44)	30 March 1952	21 July 1972	Son of Jigme	Wangchuck	Jigme Dorji Wangchuck of Bhutan
Jigme Singye: 4th Druk Gyalpo; འཇིགས་མེད་སེང་གེ་དབང་ཕྱུག་	11 November 1955 (age 71)	21 July 1972	9 December 2006 (abdicated)	Son of Jigme Dorji	Wangchuck	Jigme Singye Wangchuck of Bhutan
Jigme Khesar Namgyel: 5th Druk Gyalpo; འཇིགས་མེད་གེ་སར་རྣམ་རྒྱལ་དབང་ཕྱུག་	21 February 1980 (age 46)	9 December 2006	Incumbent	Son of Jigme Singye	Wangchuck	Jigme Khesar Namgyel Wangchuck of Bhutan

== See also ==
- Tibetan dual system of government
- Queen of Bhutan
- Constitution of Bhutan
- History of Bhutan
- Politics of Bhutan
