= Aum Tshewang Lham =

Aum Tshewang Lham was a vocalist from Tshangkha, Trongsa Bhutan. She was among the selected in a group by the Third Bhutanese King, Jigme Dorji Wangchuck, who is also known as the Third Druk Gyalpo, to go and record the first ever traditional music album of Bhutanese culture; in the year 1968 in Calcutta, India. Among the selected were: Bhutan's most famous female vocalist at the time, 'Aum Thinlem' and 'Aum Dawpey' a famous Bhutanese lute instrument player who was the only one to be rewarded the 'Thugesy' by the king whom Aum Tshewang Lham served for four years.

The Zhabdro Gorgom styled songs were sung and written in Dzongkha language. The group recorded several tracks in 1968, which were released in 2015. Aum Tshewang Lham was honoured with the "Druk Norbu" musical award, by Her Royal Highness Princess Ashi Deki Yangzom Wangchuck.

== Biography ==
Aum Tshewang Lham grew up in the Trongsa side of Tshangkha, where she would herd cattle and eventually developed the passion of singing at a young age. She started professionally singing at age 12. Singing came naturally for her as she continued to grow. Aum Tshewang Lham was a mother of three who worked with' Namgay Jigs' to pay tribute and celebrate the lives of mothers and their hardships. This revealed the Pride of Beloved Mothers of Bhutan. Aum Tshewang Lham had performed for various people including His Majesty The King and Her Majesty The Queen when he visited her village.
