= Dechencholing Palace =

- Dechencholing

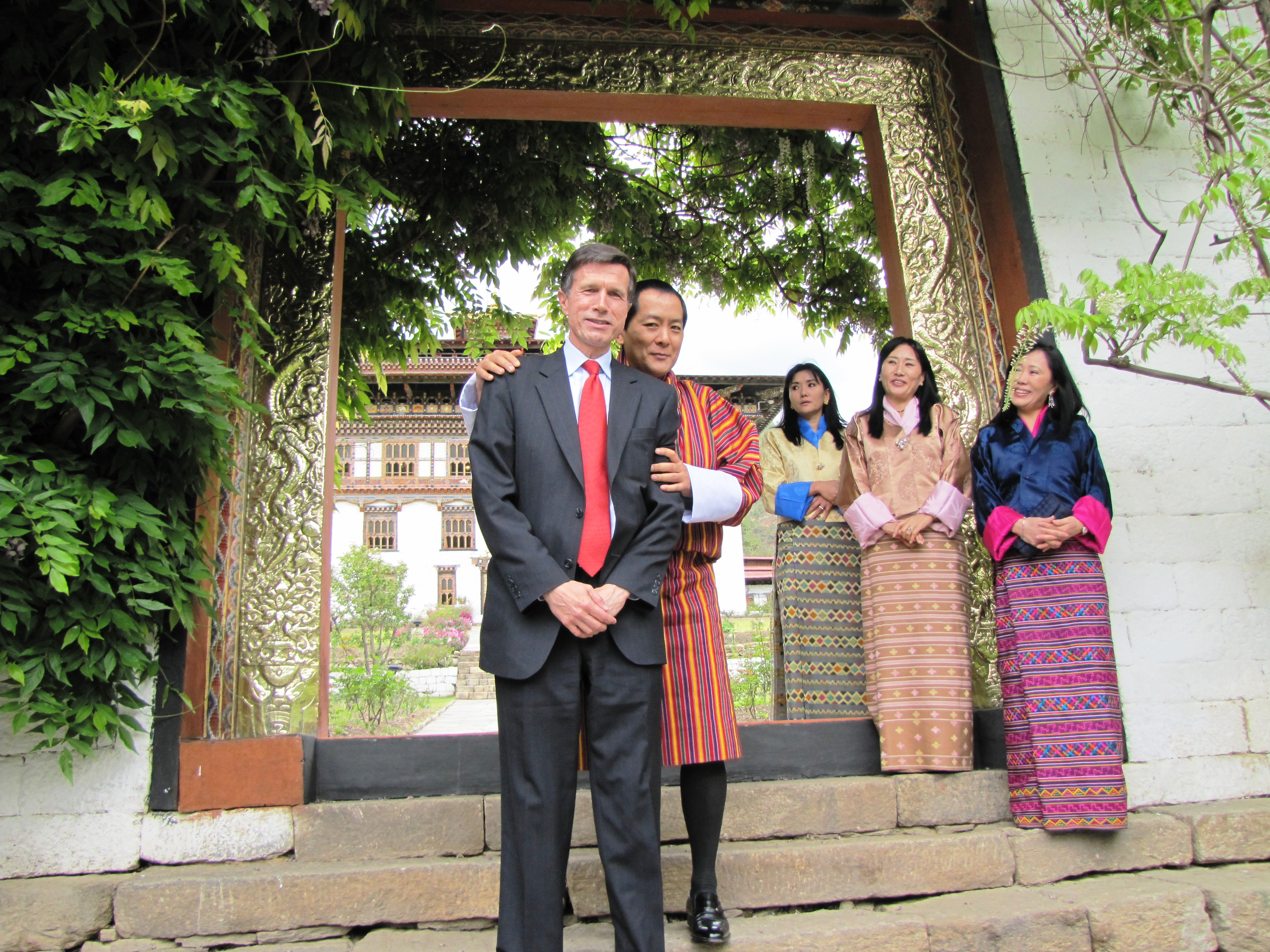
- Jigme Singye Wangchuck with his three wives and Robert O. Blake Jr., 2010

- Location within Bhutan

General information
- Type: Palace
- Architectural style: Bhutanese
- Location: Thimphu, Bhutan
- Coordinates: 27.523534°N 89.64273°E
- Construction started: 1952
- Completed: 1953
- Owner: Government of Bhutan

Technical details
- Structural system: Palace
- Floor count: Three

Design and construction
- Architect: Druk Gyalpo Jigme Dorji Wangchuck

Dechencholing Palace (Dzongkha: བདེ་ཆེན་ཆོས་གླིང་, romanized: dechencholing) is located in Thimphu, the capital of Bhutan, 4 kilometres (2.5 mi) to the north of the Tashichho Dzong and 7 kilometres (4.3 mi) north of the city centre. It was built in 1953 by the third king of Bhutan Druk Gyalpo Jigme Dorji Wangchuck.

== Geography ==
The palace lies at the northern end of the Thimphu Valley, on the west bank of the Thimphu River. The palace is accessed via the Dechhen Lam (road) which runs along the eastern bank of the Thimphu river from the district of Yangchenphug, through Langjupakha for several kilometres before approaching the palace. On the way to the palace the road passes the Royal Banquet Hall, the Centre for Bhutan Studies, the Woodcraft Centre and then passes the Indian Estate on the other side of the river. Just south of the palace on the other side of the river is the suburb of Taba. The palace is surrounded by forest to the east and west; the eastern forest is denser and is said to be the only leafy forest in the city. Opposite on a slope in the forest high above Taba is the Wangchuck Resort, used as a meditation retreat (the retreat has no connection to the palace).

== History ==
Dechencholing Palace was built in 1953 after the coronation of the third King of Bhutan, Druk Gyalpo Jigme Dorji Wangchuck, following the death of his father, Druk Gyalpo Jigme Wangchuck, in 1952. The third king's son Jigme Singye Wangchuck was born here on 11 November 1955. Later, one hundred thousand Raksha Thotreng rituals were performed at the palace as a beneficial rite for the public enthronement of the Jigme Singye Wangchuck in 1974.

The late Royal Grandmother, Druk Gyalpo’s mother the Dowager Queen Phuntsho Choden (Ashi Phuntsho Choden), popularly known as Gayum Angay Phuntsho Choden Wangchuck, lived in this palace as a Buddhist nun. However, the present King does not stay in this palace, as the royal residence is now at the Samteling Palace (Royal Cottage).

The palace is frequently used for international delegations, especially those with India. Indian ambassadors regularly visit the palace to discuss international relations between India and Bhutan. It is also the venue for hosting luncheons and banquets for Head of the States and other important guests of Bhutan.

== Structure ==
The palace is a three-storied building set amidst willow trees, lawns and ponds. Except for the present King, other members of the Royal family reside here. Its architecture is entirely in Bhutanese traditional style including the furnishings inside. The palace interior furnishings are said to be encased in metal in repoussé technique superimposed on white velvet.

The late Royal Grandmother, Gayum Phuntsho Choden Wangchuck lived in this palace for many years and possessed her own chapel, adorned with paintings and carvings and candles burning from bowls. Gayum employed a number of women at the palace to weave garments for men and women, producing national dress costumes. As the palace frequently hosts international delegations, it has its own helipad to facilitate swift access even though there is no airport in Thimphu.

In 1957, King Jigme Wangchuck commissioned a skilled artist named Lam Durlop Dorji of Bumthang to open an embroidery school at the palace, to instruct some 30 young monks in this field. The school has produced several notable thangka embroideries, notably Thongdrel (large thangkas hanging from the roof tops of monasteries and dzongs), and Thangkas (scroll paintings). As Bhutan is a Tibetan Buddhist nation this school heavily revolves around Buddhism, which is reflected in its artwork.
