= Phuntsho Choden =

Queen of Bhutan from 1926 to 1952

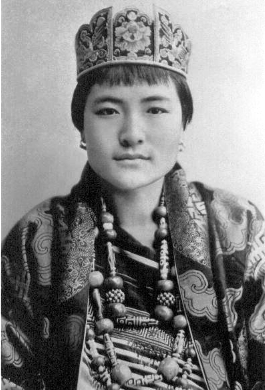
- Phuntsho Choden in 1926

Queen consort of Bhutan
- Tenure: 26 August 1926 – 30 March 1952
- Coronation: 14 March 1927
- Co-Druk Gyaltsuen: Pema Dechen
- Born: 1911; Wangducholing Palace, Bumthang
- Died: 24 August 2003 (aged 91–92); Dechencholing Palace
- Spouse: Jigme Wangchuck (m. 1926; died 1952)
- Issue: Jigme Dorji Wangchuck
Names
- Gayum Angay Phuntsho Choden (Note: Women in Bhutan retain their names upon marriage.)
- House: Wangchuck (by marriage)
- Father: Dasho Jamyang, Chumed Zhalgno
- Mother: Ashi Decho Dorji
- Religion: Buddhism

Ashi Phuntsho Choden (1911 – 24 August 2003) was the queen consort of Bhutan, as the wife of King Jigme Wangchuck.

== Early life ==
Ashi Phuntsho Choden was born in 1911 at Wangducholing Palace to Chumed Zhalgno, Dasho Jamyang (of the Tamzhing Choji family – also known as the Myo family) and Ashi Decho, daughter of Ashi Yeshay Choden (who was the sister of Druk Gyalpo Gongsar Ugyen Wangchuck).

From an early age, Ashi Phuntsho Choden received a traditional education, including lessons on Buddhism. She received teachings, empowerment, and reading transmissions in the Drukpa Kargyu, Karma Kargyu, Dujom, Peling, and Nyingthig traditions from renowned Buddhist lamas.

== Marriage and family ==
She married Bhutan's second king, a cross cousin, Jigme Wangchuck, in 1923, when she was 12 years old at Thinley Rabten Palace, Phodrang. They were second cousins. Ashi Phuntsho Choden was the half-sister of the maternal grandfather of the current Queen of Bhutan, Jetsun Pema, and she was the great grandmother of the Fifth Druk Gyalpo, Jigme Khesar Namgyel Wangchuck. She made sure that her only child, Druk Gyalsey Jigme Dorji Wangchuck, learned both English and Hindi in early childhood to prepare him for Bhutan's escalating involvement in foreign diplomacy.

Her younger sister, Ashi Pema Dechen (1918–1991), was the second wife of her husband since 1932, when she was 14 years old.She also had a younger half brother from her father's second marriage, "Dasho" jamphel dorji

== Royal duties ==
She was very religious. Phuntsho Choden played an important role in maintaining and strengthening Bhutan's rich Buddhist heritage. She built a legacy of religious institutions, established spiritual learning centres, and preserved the rich imagery that formed a core of Bhutan’s religious history.

She created the monument National Memorial Chorten in Thimphu which she built in memory of her son, His Majesty Jigme Dorji Wangchuck, for the well being of the nation and the people.

== Death ==
She died on 24 August 2003 at Dechencholing Palace. Her body was ceremoniously laid out for 49 days and was taken to places she had been to when she was living.

== Honours ==
Styles of Queen Grandmother Phuntsho Choden
- Reference style: Her Majesty
- Spoken style: Your Majesty
- Alternative style: The Royal Grandmother

- Bhutan :
  - King Jigme Singye Investiture Medal (2 June 1974).
  - Commemorative Silver Jubilee Medal of King Jigme Singye (2 June 1999).

== Ancestry ==
Ancestors of Phuntsho Choden

4. Lamala
2. Jamyang, Chumed Zhalgno
5. Kunzang Lhamo
1. Phuntsho Choden
24. Ugyen Phuntsho, 8th Trongsa Penlop (= 30)
12. Pema Tenzin, Penlop of Jakar
25. Rinchen Pelmo (= 31)
6. Chimi Dorji, Dzongpon of Thimphu
13. Lhamo
3. Decho Dorji
28. Pila Gonpo Wangyal
14. Jigme Namgyal, 10th Trongsa Penlop and 51st Druk Desi
29. Sonam Pedzom
7. Yeshay Choden
30. Ugyen Phuntsho, 8th Trongsa Penlop (= 24)
15. Pema Choki
31. Rinchen Pelmo (= 25)

== Notes ==
Phuntsho Choden House of Wangchuck Born: 1911 Died: 24 August 2003
Bhutanese royalty
Preceded by Tsundue Pema Lhamo	Queen consort of Bhutan; 1926–1952	Succeeded by Kesang Choden
Preceded by –	Queen Mother of Bhutan; 1952–1972	Succeeded by Kesang Choden
Preceded by –	Queen Grandmother of Bhutan; 1972–2003	Succeeded by Kesang Choden
