= Pema Dechen =

Queen of Bhutan from 1932 to 1952

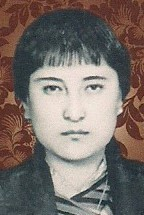
- Pema Dechen in 1932

Queen consort of Bhutan
- Tenure: 1932 – 30 March 1952
- Co-Druk Gyaltsuen: Phuntsho Choden
- Born: 1918; Wangducholing Palace, Bumthang
- Died: 1991 (aged 72–73); Samchoeling Palace, Trongsa
- Spouse: Jigme Wangchuck (m. 1932; died 1952)
- Issue: Princess Choki Wangmo Wangchuck; Prince Namgyel Wangchuck; Princess Deki Yangzom Wangchuck; Princess Pema Choden Wangchuck
Names
- Pema Dechen Wangchuck (Note: Women in Bhutan retain their names upon marriage.)
- House: Wangchuck (by marriage)
- Father: Dasho Jamyang, Chumed Zhalgno
- Mother: Ashi Decho Dorji
- Religion: Buddhism

Ashi Pema Dechen (1918–1991) was the queen consort of Bhutan.

== Early life ==
Ashi Pema Dechen was born in 1918 at Wangducholing Palace to Chumed Zhalgno, Dasho Jamyang (of the Tamzhing Choji family – also known as the Myo family -) and Ashi Decho, daughter of Ashi Yeshay Choden (who was the sister of Druk Gyalpo Gongsar Ugyen Wangchuck).

She had two full-brothers and two full-sisters, and another half-siblings by the second marriages of her parents:

- Dasho Gonpo Dorji, Chumed Zhalgno.
- Ashi Phuntsho Choden (1911–2003).
- Dasho Lam Nado (1920–1989).
- Ashi Chimi.

From an early age, Ashi Pema Dechen received a traditional education.

== Marriage and family ==
She married Bhutan's second king, a cross cousin, Jigme Wangchuck, in 1932, when she was 14 years old. They were second cousins and she was his second wife. Ashi Pema Dechen was the half-sister of the maternal grandfather of the current Queen of Bhutan, Jetsun Pema, and she was the great grandmother of the Fifth Druk Gyalpo, Jigme Khesar Namgyel Wangchuck.

Her elder sister, Ashi Phuntsho Choden (1911–2003), was the first wife of her husband since 1923 when she was 12 years old, at Thinley Rabten Palace, Phodrang.

Her children with the Second Druk Gyalpo were:

- Princess (Druk Gyalsem) Choki Wangmo Wangchuck (born 1937).
- Prince (Druk Gyalsey) Namgyel Wangchuck, 26th Penlop of Paro (born 1943).
- Princess (Druk Gyalsem) Deki Yangzom Wangchuck (born 1946).
- Princess (Druk Gyalsem) Pema Choden Wangchuck (born 1949).

== Death ==
She died in 1991 at Samchoeling Palace.

== Ancestry ==
Ancestors of Pema Dechen

4. Lamala
2. Jamyang, Chumed Zhalgno
5. Kunzang Lhamo
1. Pema Dechen
12. Pema Tenzin, Penlop of Jakar
6. Chimi Dorji, Dzongpon of Thimphu
13. Lhamo
3. Decho Dorji
14. Jigme Namgyal, 10th Trongsa Penlop and 51st Druk Desi
7. Yeshay Choden
15. Pema Choki

== Notes ==
Pema Dechen House of Wangchuck Born: 1918 Died: 1991
Bhutanese royalty
Preceded by Phuntsho Choden	Queen consort of Bhutan; 1932–1952	Succeeded by Kesang Choden
Preceded by –	Queen Mother of Bhutan; 1952–1972	Succeeded by Kesang Choden
Preceded by –	Queen Grandmother of Bhutan; 1972–1991	Succeeded by Kesang Choden
