= Queen of Bhutan =

Queen consort of Bhutan

Druk Gyaltsuen of Bhutan

Incumbent
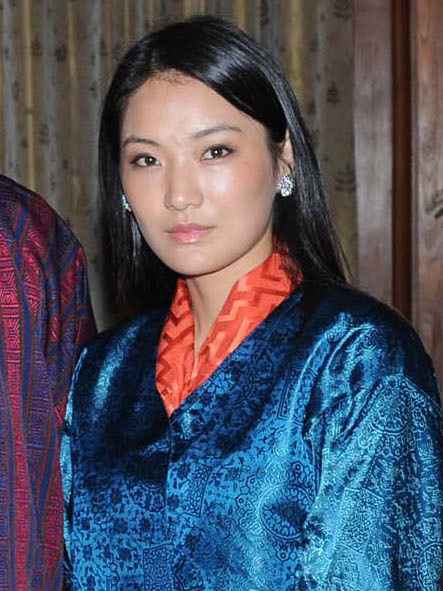
- Jetsun Pema
- 5th Dragon Queen

Details
- Style: Her Majesty
- First monarch: Tsundue Pema Lhamo
- Formed: 17 December 1907
- Residences: Samteling Palace, Thimphu

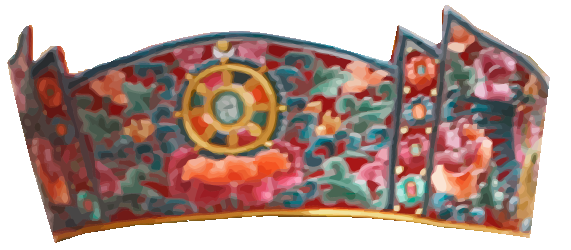
Phoenix Crown of the Dragon Queen

The Druk Gyaltsuen (lit. 'Dragon Queen') is the queen consort of the Kingdom of Bhutan. In the Dzongkha language, Bhutan is known as Drukyul which translates as "The Land of the Thunder Dragon". Thus, while Queens of Bhutan are known as Druk Gyaltsuen ("Dragon Queen"), the Bhutanese people call themselves the Drukpa, meaning "Dragon people".

The existing queen consort of Bhutan is Jetsun Pema Wangchuck, the 5th Druk Gyaltsuen. She wears the hand-sewn silk Phoenix Crown, which is the official crown worn by the Queens of Bhutan.

She also has a carved jade gold Tiara.

Queen Ashi Jetsun Pema Wangchuck is the youngest consort in the world at age 27 as of 2017.

== List of Druk Gyaltsuens ==
| No. | Portrait | Name | Lifespan | King | Tenure |
|---|---|---|---|---|---|
| 1 | | Tsundue Pema Lhamo | 1886 – April 1922 (aged 35) | Ugyen Wangchuck | 1907–1922 |
| 2 | | Phuntsho Choden | 1911 – 24 August 2003 (aged 92) | Jigme Wangchuck | 1926–1952 |
| 2 | | Pema Dechen | 1918 – 1991 (aged 72) | Jigme Wangchuck | 1932–1952 |
| 3 | | Kesang Choden | 21 May 1930 (age 96) | Jigme Dorji Wangchuck | 1952–1972 |
| 4 | | Dorji Wangmo | 10 June 1955 (age 71) | Jigme Singye Wangchuck | 1979–2006 |
| 4 | | Tshering Pem | 22 December 1957 (age 68) | Jigme Singye Wangchuck | 1979–2006 |
| 4 | | Tshering Yangdon | 21 June 1959 (age 67) | Jigme Singye Wangchuck | 1979–2006 |
| 4 | | Sangay Choden | 11 May 1963 (age 63) | Jigme Singye Wangchuck | 1979–2006 |
| 5 | | Jetsun Pema | 4 June 1990 (age 36) | Jigme Khesar Namgyel Wangchuck | 2011–present |

== See also ==
- Constitution of Bhutan
- Druk
- Druk Gyalpo
- Dual system of government
- History of Bhutan
- House of Wangchuck
- Politics of Bhutan
