= Thruepang Palace =

Historic building in Bhutan

Thruepang Palace is a royal dzong (a form of fortress) in Trongsa District, Bhutan. The royal government of Bhutan considers it to be a historic building.

== History ==
=== Early history ===
Located on the hillside, the palace was considered crucial in establishing control in the early days of the kingdom.

The dzong (fortress) portion was constructed in 1648. The first and second kings used the fortress to rule the kingdom from this crucial position.

=== Modern history ===
It is the birthplace of the third Druk Gyalpo (King) Jigme Dorji Wangchuck of Bhutan in 1928. He spent is early days growing up in the palace.

This was a secondary resident and served as a, but not main, royal palace for the second Druk Gyalpo (king) Jigme Wangchuck and Queen Ashi Puntsho Choden. The Trhruepang Palace currently is still in use as a winter royal palace for the current king Jigme Khesar Namgyel Wangchuck.

It is customary that any and future kings of Bhutan to serve as governor of the village, with his residence in the palace, before ascension to the throne.

== Description ==
=== Location ===
The dzong is located on the hillside overlooking the village of Thruepang within the Nubi gewog village block in the district of Trongsa. Not far from the palace is the local market place. The palace sits upon a hill that leads straight to the Thruepang village.

Travel from the capital Thimpu requires 192 kilometers of travel and 8 hours of time.

=== Architecture ===
The palace largely can be attributed a large house rather than a full scale palace. There are 2 stories palace that sits on 10 acres of land.

== Festivals ==
Tschechu is a religious festival that brings people from all walks of life to Trongska. This festival, the one hosted here, also honors the establishment of the roots of the kingdom by the first and second kings of Bhutan. Dates of the event occurs on the tenth day of a month (not specified) of the Tibetan calendar. In 2011, the event occurred on January 2 to January 4.
