= Wangduechhoeling Palace =

Wangduechhoeling Palace Interior in 2006.

Wangduechhoeling Palace Museum and Cultural Center (Dzongkha: དབང་འདུས་ཆོས་གླིང་རྫོང) is a museum in the Chamkhar valley of Bumthang District in central Bhutan.

The first Wangchuck residence build by Trongsa Penlop Jigme Namgyel built in 1857 to celebrate his victory agaisnt Tsondrue Gyeltshen in 1853. It was the birthplace for Ugyen Wangchuck. The palace fell into disrepair following the Wangchucks's moving residence to Dechencholing Palace in 1953, along with the moving of the capital from Punakha to Thimphu. In 2012, Bhutan Foundation, and Department of Culture supported by Queen Mother Tseyring Wangchuck, Hoch and Oltramare families and Rubin Museum of Himalayan Art begun restoration efforts to repurpose the building as a museum for History of the Wangchuck Family and Bhutan. On October 30 2024, the consecration ceremony would be held with attendance from Queen Jetsun Pema. On May 2, 2025 the museum would be opened to the public.

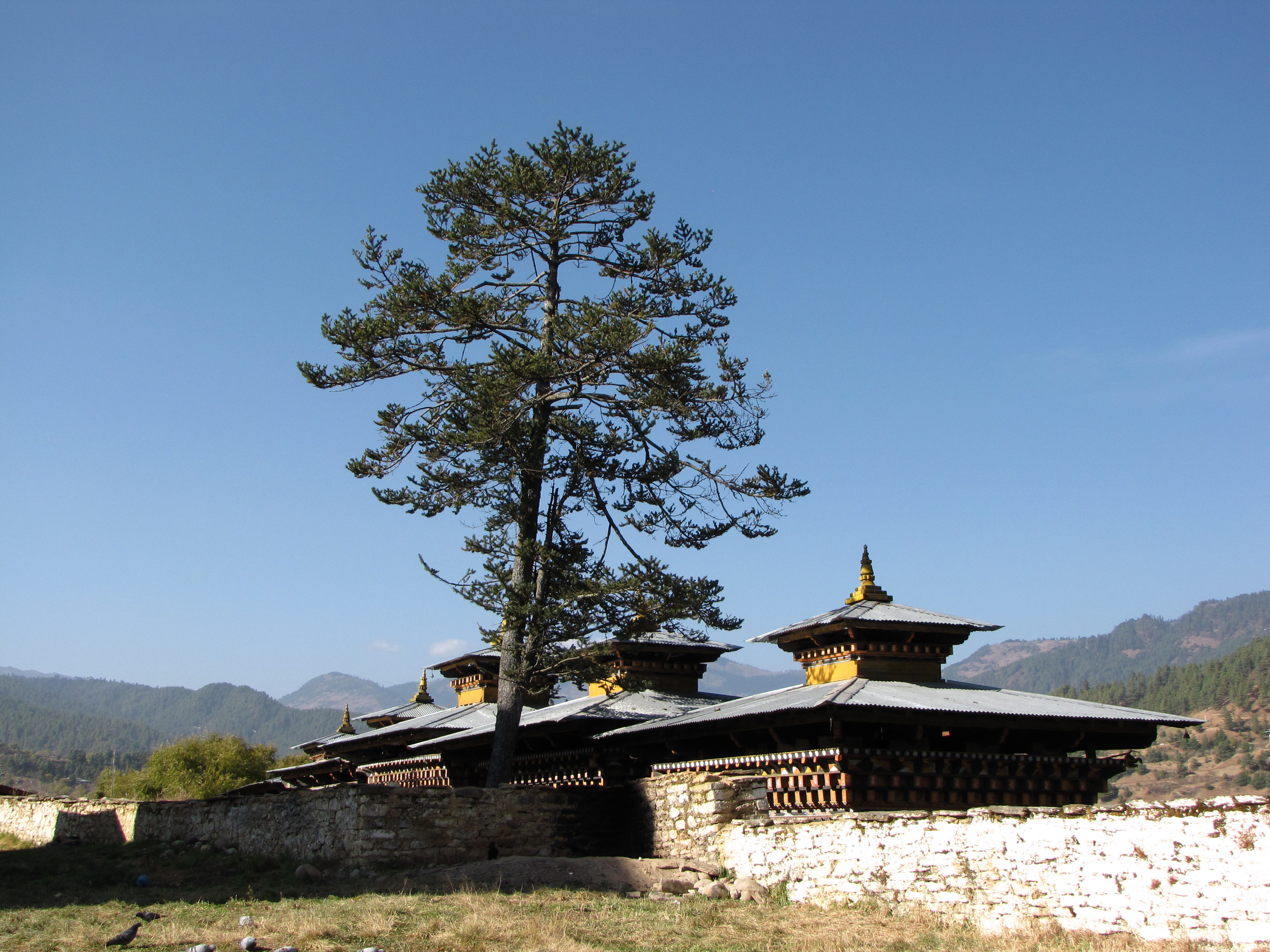
Wangduechhoeling's Prayer wheels in 2009.
