= Tsundue Pema Lhamo =

Queen of Bhutan from 1907 to 1922

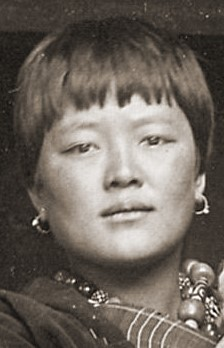
- Prior to being queen, 1905

Queen consort of Bhutan
- Tenure: 17 December 1907 – April 1922
- Coronation: 17 December 1907
- Born: 1886; Kurto Khoma
- Died: April 1922 (aged 35–36); Wangducholing Palace, Bumthang
- Spouse: Ugyen Wangchuck (m. 1901)
- Issue: King Jigme Wangchuck; Prince Gyurme Dorji; Princess Kencho Wangmo; Prince Karma Thinley Lhundrub
Names
- Maharani Tsundue Pema Lamo (Note: Women in Bhutan retain their names upon marriage.)
- House: Wangchuck (by marriage)
- Father: Kunzang Thinley
- Mother: Sangay Drolma
- Religion: Buddhism

Ashi Tsundue Pema Lhamo (1886–1922) was the first queen consort of Bhutan.

== Early life ==
Ashi Tsundue Pema Lhamo was born in 1886 in Kurto Khoma, as the daughter of Kunzang Thinley, 18th and 20th Dzongpon of Thimphu, and his wife, Sangay Drolma, a noble lady from Kurto Khoma.

Her father, Kunzang Thinley, was a first cousin of the First Druk Gyalpo, Ugyen Wangchuck (her future husband).

She has an only brother, Ugyen Thinley Dorji (1906–1949), 8th Gangteng Tulku.

She belonged to the Peling and the Nyö lineages.

== Marriage and family ==
She married, as his fourth wife, Gongsar Ugyen Wangchuck. The wedding took place at Wangducholing Palace, Bumthang, in 1901. She was 15 years old.

At first, she was called Maharani in her country.

Her children with the First Druk Gyalpo were:

- Dasho N. Wangchuck (1903–died in infancy).
- HM The Second King (Druk Gyalpo) Jigme Wangchuck (1905–1952).
- HRH Prince (Druk Gyalsey) Gyurme Dorji (1911–1933). Unmarried and without issue.
- HRH Princess (Druk Gyalsem) Kencho Wangmo (1914–ca.1975). Educated at Bumthang Palace School. A great patron of traditional arts and religious institutions, a lyricist and composer of boedra songs. She became a Buddhist nun in later life, and died unmarried at the Jangchubling Monastery.
- HRH Prince (Druk Gyalsey) Karma Thinley Lhundrub (1917–1949), Dronyer. Died unmarried at Jangchubling Monastery (Gangzur).

== Queen of Bhutan ==
Tsundue Pema Lhamo, the first Queen consort of Bhutan, was deeply devoted to Buddhism and was the only woman in the district of Bumthang whose wrist fit Yeshe Tsogyal's bracelet.

She died in April 1922 at Wangducholing Palace.

== Ancestry ==
Ancestors of Tsundue Pema Lhamo

8. Pila Gonpo Wangyal
4. Dungkar Gyeltshen, 11th Trongsa Penlop
9. Sonam Pedzom
2. Kunzang Thinley, Dzongpon of Thimphu
1. Tsundue Pema Lhamo
6. Kencho Wangdu
3. Sangay Drolma

== Notes ==
Tsundue Pema Lhamo House of Wangchuck Born: 1886 Died: April 1922
Bhutanese royalty
Preceded by None (Hereditary Monarchy Created)	Queen consort of Bhutan; 1907–1922	Succeeded by Phuntsho Choden; Pema Dechen
