= Dorji Namgyal =

Bhutanese Penlop

Dorji Namgyal (Dzongkha: རྡོ་རྗེ་རྣམ་རྒྱལ) was a Bhutanese Penlop. He worked as a public servant from an early age and eventually became the Penlop of Trongsa, and was appointed Druk Desi (1831–1832). He died while repairing Punakha Dzong, which had been destroyed by fire when a civil war broke out.
