= Yeshe Ngodub =

Bhutanese politician (1851–1917)

Choley Yeshe Ngodub
- ཡེ་ཤེས་དངོས་གྲུབ
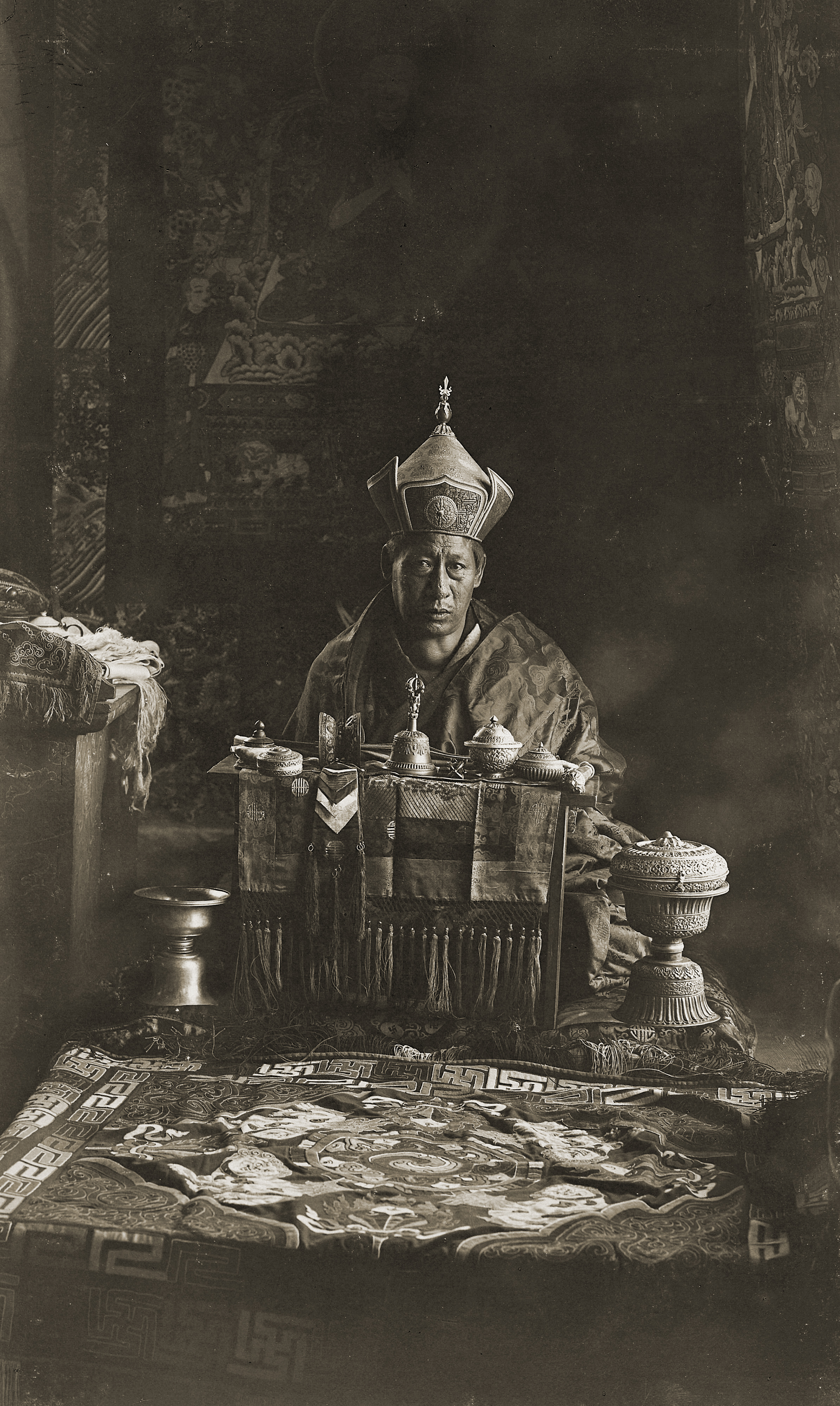
- Yeshe Ngodub in 1905

54th Druk Desi
- In office 1903–1905
- Preceded by: Sangay Dorji
- Succeeded by: position abolished; monarchy established from 1907 (Ugyen Wangchuk as King of Bhutan)

Je Khenpo
- In office 1915–1917

Personal details
- Born: 1851 Tang Valley, Bumthang District, Bhutan
- Died: 1917 (aged 65–66)

Choley Yeshe Ngodub or simply Yeshe Ngodub (Dzongkha: ཡེ་ཤེས་དངོས་གྲུབ།) (1851–1917) was the 54th and the last Druk Desi (secular ruler of Bhutan) who reigned from 1903 to 1905. He was also appointed the Je Khenpo (religious head of Bhutan) from 1915 until his death in 1917. He was the only one to hold both offices of the dual system of government of Bhutan.

== Early life ==
Ngodub was born in 1851 in the Tang Valley of Bumthang in central Bhutan. While still a child, he was identified as the fifth speech reincarnation of Zhabdrung Ngawang Namgyal by the Central Monastic Body of Bhutan and ultimately enthroned at Sang Chokhor in Paro, a seat of his incarnation line.
