= Jigme Dorji Wangchuck =

King of Bhutan from 1952 to 1972

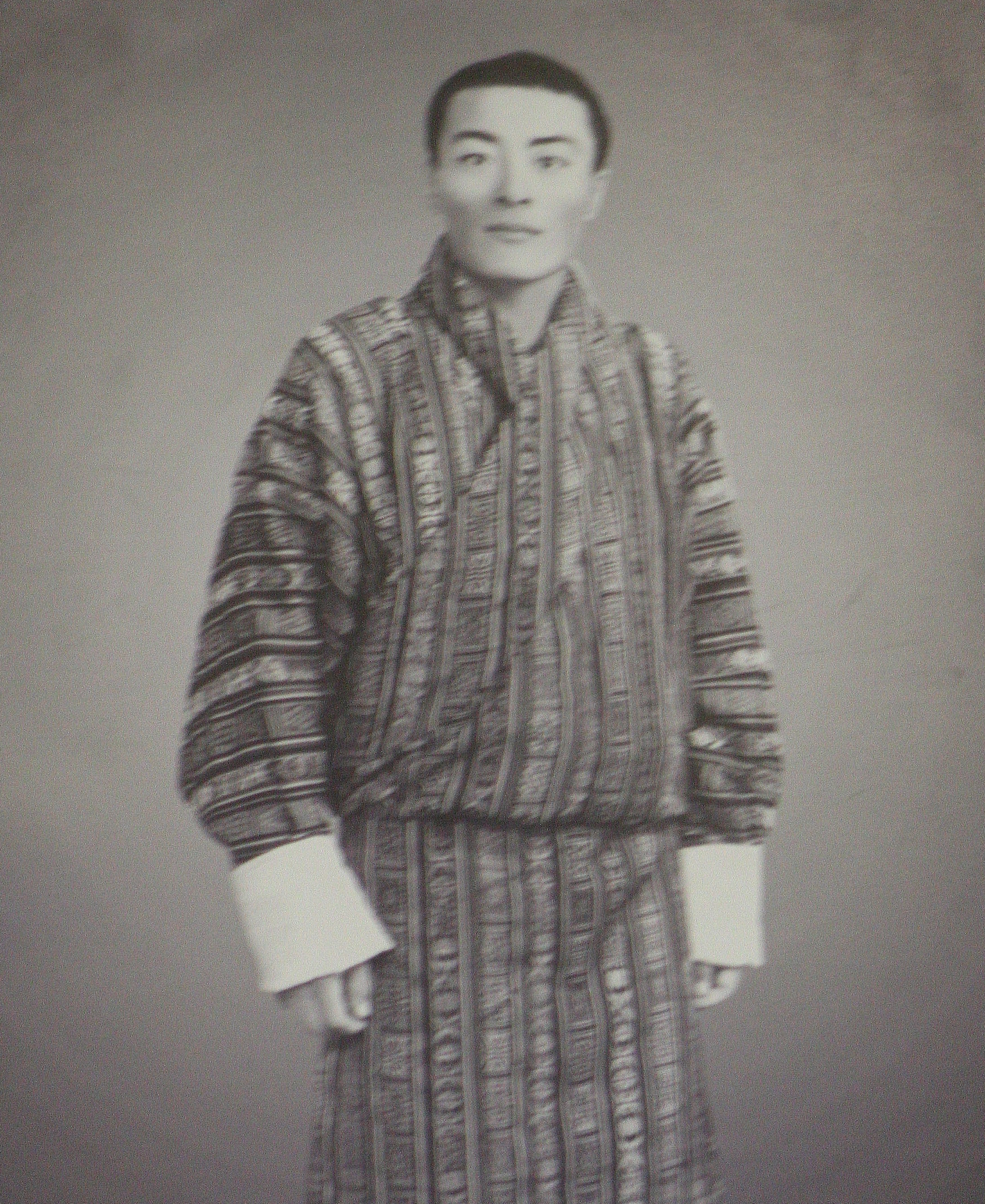
- Picture of King Jigme Dorji Wangchuck at Paro International Airport

King of Bhutan
- Reign: 30 March 1952 – 21 July 1972
- Coronation: 27 October 1952
- Predecessor: Jigme Wangchuck
- Successor: Jigme Singye Wangchuck
- Born: 2 May 1928; Thruepang Palace, Trongsa, Bhutan
- Died: 21 July 1972 (aged 44); Nairobi, Kenya
- Burial: Cremated at Kurjey Lhakhang 27°37′N 90°42′E
- Spouse: Ashi Kesang Choden (m. 1951)
- Issue: Sonam Choden Wangchuck; Dechen Wangmo Wangchuck; Jigme Singye Wangchuck; Pema Lhaden Wangchuck; Kesang Wangmo Wangchuck
- Dynasty: Wangchuck
- Father: Jigme Wangchuck
- Mother: Ashi Phuntsho Choden
- Religion: Buddhism

Jigme Dorji Wangchuck (Dzongkha: འབྲུག་རྒྱལ་པོ་ འཇིགས་མེད་རྡོ་རྗེ་དབང་ཕྱུག་མཆོག་, Wylie: 'brug rgyal po 'jigs med rdo rje dbang phyug mchog; 2 May 1928 – 21 July 1972) was King of Bhutan from 30 March 1952 until his death in 1972.

He began to open Bhutan to the outside world, began modernization, and took the first step towards democratization.

== Early life ==
Jigme Dorji Wangchuck was born in 1928 in Thruepang Palace in Trongsa. At a young age, he was apprenticed in etiquette and leadership at the royal court of his father the King. Wangchuck was educated in a British manner in Kalimpong and Bishop Cotton School, Simla and he went on study tours to many foreign countries such as Scotland and Switzerland from where he drew inspiration to develop Bhutan with suitable adaptations. In 1943, he was appointed Trongsa Dronyer and then elevated as the 25th Paro Penlop in 1950, upon the death of the 24th Paro Penlop, Tshering Penjor (1902–1949). Wangchuck married Ashi Kesang Choden Wangchuck (born 1930), the daughter of Gongzim (Lord Chamberlain) Sonam Topgay Dorji (1896–1953), at the Ugyen Pelri Palace, Paro, on 5 October 1951. With Queen Ashi Kesang Choden, they had five children. The royal wedding was held at the Garden Palace. He also had a concubine, with whom he fathered four additional children. The following year, Wangchuck became the King after his father died in Kuenga Rabten Palace. Coronation was held in Punakha Dzong on 27 October 1952.

== Reign ==
=== Father of modern Bhutan ===
During his 20-year reign that ended in July 1972, the fundamental reorientation of Bhutanese society began. Wangchuck not only achieved the reorganisation of society and government, but also consolidated Bhutan's sovereignty and security. He mobilised resources from the international donors as aid. Wangchuck's strategy was to broaden the source of aid by developing relationships with other countries. Bhutan joined the Colombo Plan in 1962 to obtain international aid. However, India became the main source of financial and technical assistance. He was a deft and farsighted planner in the sense that he modernised Bhutan without destabilizing its culture and tradition. Wangchuck brought modern techniques and methods to preserve and promote the culture of Bhutan, yet at the same time, he introduced Western science and technology. He was a forerunner among environmentalists in this part of the world. The Manas Sanctuary established in 1966 was one of the first in the region.

=== Political and social reforms ===
In the context of Bhutan, there were small groups who were bonded labourers. They would work on the farms of the aristocratic and prominent families. In return, they would receive food, lodging and clothes. As soon as he became the King, labourers who worked on the royal lands were made into tenants and sharecroppers instead of indentured labourers. Later, similar indentured labourers were set free in other areas of the country, especially in some parts of Eastern Bhutan, where they were concentrated. In 1953, Wangchuck opened the National Assembly of Bhutan in 1953 in Punakha Dzong. For the first time, elders from different gewogs (administrative units) were invited to voice their concerns, ideas and solutions for the future of this country. At the same time, it was a forum for Wangchuck to share his larger vision for Bhutan in the years to come. After the National Assembly was established in 1953, the king drafted and devised a series of progressive laws for the Kingdom. The King brought out a holistic set of laws covering fundamental aspects of Bhutanese life such as land, livestock, marriage, inheritance, property and so forth. The Thrimzhung Chenmo (Supreme Law) was passed by the National Assembly in 1959. The laws are very organic, coherently interrelated within themselves and to the evolving reality and manifested his vision of law-based society. Along with the promulgation of Thrimzhung Chenmo, a mechanism to implement and enforce laws was needed. Wangchuck decided to open the judiciary, first with the appointment of Thrimpons (judges) in districts, and then finally to the High Court, which was set up in 1968. These administrative and social reforms were prior to any economic modernisation programmes. In 1955, he intensified the conversion of commodity taxes to cash taxes by assessing land for cash taxation. Cash taxes were nominal, but moving from commodity taxes to cash taxes was a radical step at that time. Apart from promulgation of better laws and tax reforms, the Royal Bhutan Army was formally established in 1963. Furthermore, the entitlements of all officials were converted from commodities to cash and new designations were given. Wangchuck established new Ministries in 1968.

=== Culture and education ===
The king paid considerable policy attention on preserving Bhutanese culture so that Bhutan could always perpetuate itself as a culturally distinct nation, in particular with a flourishing Buddhist culture. He commissioned Buddhist monuments, including a large statue of the Buddha near the parliament building in Thimphu, as well as ornate copies of Buddhist texts such as the Kangyur and Tengyur.

He established Simtokha Rigzhung Lobdra (now known as the Institute of Language and Cultural Studies) in 1967, where a new breed of traditional scholars could be nurtured. He also increased the number of monks in many dratshangs. During his reign the systematic phonetic, syntax and grammatic rules of Dzongkha language were devised.

To propagate culture and traditions in schools, and to study scientific disciplines as well as humanities, the Third King established modern education on a wide spread basis. He established what were then the centres of education excellence with two public schools: Yangchenphug, in western Bhutan in 1969, and the other, Kanglung, in eastern Bhutan in 1968. An Agriculture Department was created to improve nutrition and to generate income from horticulture. The Kingdom's free health service was also founded.

=== Infrastructure development ===
Modernising Bhutan's infrastructure for transportation, communications, education, health system and agriculture started after India was receptive enough to offer aid. India became independent in 1947, and was not in any immediate position to help Bhutan. Wangchuck officially visited India in 1954. The first Indian Prime Minister Jawaharlal Nehru made a historic journey to Bhutan in September 1958. King Jigme Dorji Wangchuck then paid repeated visits to India. A year after Nehru visited Bhutan in 1958, the development of Bhutan's modern infrastructure began, with assistance from India. Although road construction started in 1959, a large scale undertaking became systematic two years later in 1961, with the commencement of the 1st Five Year Plan (FYP) that envisaged construction of 177 km of road, 108 schools, three hospitals, and 45 clinics. In 1961, motor road transport reached Thimphu. The systematic envisioning of the economic future of Bhutan through FYPs was put into practice in 1961. The idea of budgeting and programming on a five-year basis is a legacy from that period. The construction of roads expanded vigorously to the end of Jigme Dorji Wangchuck's reign; by his death, more than 1200 km (750 miles) of road had been built in the country. His last visit to central Bhutan was partly to open the Zhunglam, the highway between Wangdue Phodrang and Trongsa, in 1971.

=== Foreign relations ===
The king's priority was to continue deepening the excellent relationship with India. The second priority was to diversify the relationship with other countries. He intended to strike close economic relationship with Bangladesh. Bhutan was the first nation after India to recognise the independence of Bangladesh. One key event in his era was enabling Bhutan to join the United Nations in 1971, when it became its 125th member.

== Death ==
Wangchuck suffered from long-term heart problems; he had his first heart attack at the age of 20. In July 1972, Wangchuck traveled to Nairobi to receive treatment for this condition, but he died suddenly during this visit. The king's body was subsequently flown back to Bhutan to be cremated there.

== Styles ==
- 1929–1944: Dasho Jigme Dorji Wangchuck.
- 1944–1946: Trongsa Dronyer Dasho Jigme Dorji Wangchuck.
- 1946–1952: Paro Penlop Dasho Jigme Dorji Wangchuck.
- 1952–1963: Trongsa Penlop Dasho Jigme Dorji Wangchuck.
- 1963–1972: His Majesty Druk Gyalpo Jigme Dorji Wangchuck, King of Bhutan.

== Patronages ==
- Life Member and Patron of Maha Bodhi Society.

== Honours ==
=== National honours ===
- Bhutan:
  - Grand Master of the Royal Order of Bhutan (Druk Thuksey = Son of the Heart of the Thunder Dragon, 1966).

=== Foreign honours ===
- Bangladesh:
  - Recipient of the Bangladesh Liberation War Honour (Posthumous) (27/03/2012)
- India:
  - Recipient of the Padma Vibhushan (26/01/1954)
- United Kingdom:
  - Recipient of the King George V Silver Jubilee Medal (06/05/1935)
  - Recipient of the King George VI Coronation Medal (12/05/1937)

== Ancestry ==
Ancestors of Jigme Dorji Wangchuck

8. Jigme Namgyal, 10th Trongsa Penlop and 48th Druk Desi
4. Ugyen Wangchuck
9. Pema Choki (= 31)
2. Jigme Wangchuck
10. Kunzang Thinley, Dzongpon of Thimphu
5. Tsundue Pema Lhamo
11. Sangay Drolma
1. Jigme Dorji Wangchuck
12. Lamala
6. Jamyang, Chumed Zhalgno
13. Kunzang Lhamo
3. Phuntsho Choden
14. Chimi Dorji, Dzongpon of Thimphu
7. Decho Dorji
15. Yeshay Choden

== See also ==
- Jigme Dorji National Park

Jigme Dorji Wangchuck House of Wangchuck Born: 2 May 1928 Died: 21 July 1972
Regnal titles
Preceded by Jigme Wangchuck	King of Bhutan; 1952–1972	Succeeded by Jigme Singye Wangchuck
