= Samteling Palace =

Royal residence of the King of Bhutan

Samteling Palace (or Royal Cottage) is the official royal residence of the present King of Bhutan. Previously, kings of Bhutan lived at Dechencholing Palace, which is still used for official business.
