= Jigme Wangchuck =

King of Bhutan from 1926 to 1952

Jigme Wangchuk
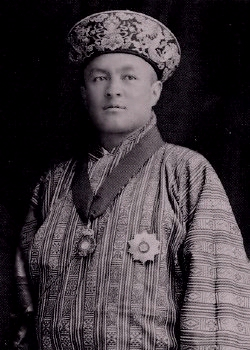

King of Bhutan
- Reign: 26 August 1926 – 30 March 1952
- Coronation: 14 March 1927
- Predecessor: Ugyen Wangchuck
- Successor: Jigme Dorji Wangchuck
- Born: 1905; Thinley Rabten Palace
- Died: 30 March 1952 (aged 47); Kuenga Rabten Palace, Dragteng Gewog, Trongsa
- Burial: Cremated at Kurjey Lhakhang
- Spouse: 1st consort-Phuntsho Choden; 2nd consort-Pema Dechen
- Issue: King Jigme Dorji Wangchuck; Princess Choki Wangmo Wangchuck; Prince Namgyel Wangchuck; Princess Deki Yangzom Wangchuck; Princess Pema Choden Wangchuck
- House: House of Wangchuck
- Father: Ugyen Wangchuck
- Mother: Tsundue Pema Lhamo
- Religion: Buddhism

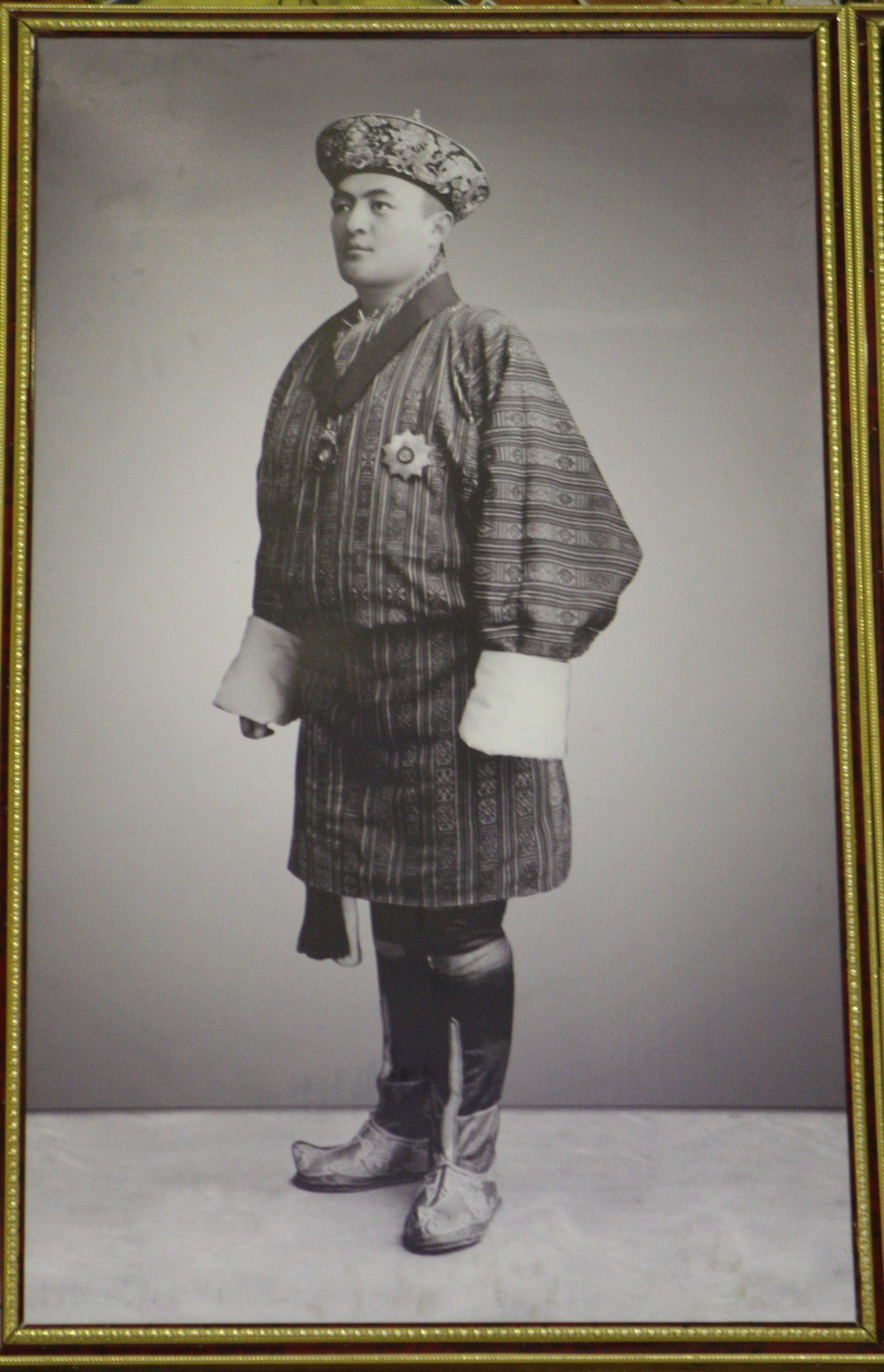
Picture of Dragon King Jigme Wangchuck at Paro International Airport

Jigme Wangchuck (Dzongkha: འཇིགས་མེད་དབང་ཕྱུག, Wylie: ’jigs med dbang phyug; 1905 – 30 March 1952) was King of Bhutan from 26 August 1926 until his death in 1952. He pursued legal and infrastructural reform during his reign. Bhutan continued to maintain almost complete isolation from the outside world during this period; its only foreign relations were with the British Raj in India, under which Bhutan was a protected state. He was succeeded by his son, Jigme Dorji Wangchuck.

== Early life ==
Jigme Wangchuck was born in 1905, at the Thinley Rabten Palace in Wangdue Phodrang District. He received his education at Wangduechhoeling Palace, where he learned English and Hindi and received a religious education. As the first son of Ugyen Wangchuck, Jigme was expected to succeed his father; accordingly, he was given the title Penlop of Trongsa in 1923.

== Reign ==
Jigme Wangchuck ascended to the throne in 1926, after the death of Ugyen Wangchuck; he received his formal coronation in Punakha on 14 March 1927. He primarily focused his energies on internal construction and infrastructure projects: for instance, Jigme oversaw the renovation of dzongs and monasteries in eastern Bhutan, and founded and renovated several schools in the country. He also built several royal residences, including the Kuenga Rabten winter palace in Trongsa and additional residences at Samdrupcholing and Domkhar. Jigme was interested in other infrastructural projects, such as improving roads and modernizing medical facilities, but was unable to pursue those projects due to a lack of revenue. Jigme also paid close attention to the administration of Bhutan's laws. He discouraged capital punishment for all crimes besides murder, reduced the judicial fees on the citizenry, and allowed citizens to call on him to appeal the judgments of lower officials.

Jigme's foreign policy was primarily isolationist, though he followed his father in maintaining friendly relations with the British Raj. When World War II broke out, Jigme sent 100,000 rupees to the Raj as a gesture of goodwill. In return, the Raj protected Bhutan's isolation by preventing Westerners from visiting the country. After India became independent, Jigme sent a delegation to initiate diplomatic relations between India and Bhutan; this meeting led to the 1949 friendship treaty between the two nations, in which Bhutan agreed to let India "guide" its foreign policy. This treaty also saw India paying an annual subsidy to Bhutan and handing over 32 square miles of land in Dewangiri.

Early in 1952, Jigme fell ill, and witnessed omens that convinced him he would die. Consequently, he resolved to spend his last days practicing archery, which was one of his favorite pastimes; however, his condition deteriorated during this time, and after ten days he had become too sick to continue with archery. He retired to the Kuenga Rabten Palace, where he died on 30 March.

== Children ==
The Second King, Jigme Wangchuck, had five children with his two cross cousins, Ashi Phuntsho Choden and her sister, Ashi Pema Dechen:

- The Third King (Druk Gyalpo) Jigme Dorji Wangchuck (by his first wife).
- Princess (Druk Gyalsem) Choki Wangmo Wangchuck (by his second wife).
- Prince (Druk Gyalsey) Namgyel Wangchuck, 26th Penlop of Paro (by his second wife).
- Princess (Druk Gyalsem) Deki Yangzom Wangchuck (by his second wife).
- Princess (Druk Gyalsem) Pema Choden Wangchuck (by his second wife).

Princess Choki Wangmo Wangchuck had two daughters, Ashi Deki Choden and Ashi Sonam Yulgyal.

Princess Pema Choden Wangchuck had four children; Ashi Namden, Dasho Namgyel Dawa (Tulku Namgyel Rinpoche), Dasho Wangchen Dawa (Kathok Situ Rinpoche) and Dasho Leon Rabten.

Princess Deki Yangzom Wangchuck had six children; Ashi Lhazen Nizal Rica, Dasho Jigme Namgyal, Dasho Wangchuck Dorji Namgyal, Ashi Yiwang Pindarica, Ashi Namzay Kumutha and the late Ashi Dechen.

== Honours ==
=== National honours ===
- Bhutan:
  - Maharaja Ugyen Wangchuck Medal 1st class in gold (17/11/1909).

=== Foreign honours ===
- British Raj:
  - Honorary Knight Commander of the Order of the Indian Empire (KCIE - 03/06/1930).
  - Companion of the Order of the Indian Empire (CIE - 11/03/1927).
  - Delhi Durbar Silver Medal (12/12/1911).
- United Kingdom :
  - Recipient of the King George V Silver Jubilee Medal (06/05/1935).
  - Recipient of the King George VI Coronation Medal (12/05/1937).

== Ancestry ==
Ancestors of Jigme Wangchuck

8. Pila Gonpo Wangyal
4. Jigme Namgyal, 10th Trongsa Penlop and 48th Druk Desi
9. Sonam Pedzom
2. Ugyen Wangchuck
10. Ugyen Phuntsho, 8th Trongsa Penlop
5. Pema Choki
11. Rinchen Pelmo
1. Jigme Wangchuck
12. Dungkar Gyeltshen, 11th Trongsa Penlop
6. Kunzang Thinley, Dzongpon of Thimphu
3. Tsundue Pema Lhamo
14. Kencho Wangdu
7. Sangay Drolma

== See also ==
- House of Wangchuck

Jigme Wangchuck House of Wangchuck Born: 1905 Died: 30 March 1952
Regnal titles
Preceded by Ugyen Wangchuck	King of Bhutan; 1926–1952	Succeeded by Jigme Dorji Wangchuck
