= Ugyen Wangchuck =

King of Bhutan from 1907 to 1926

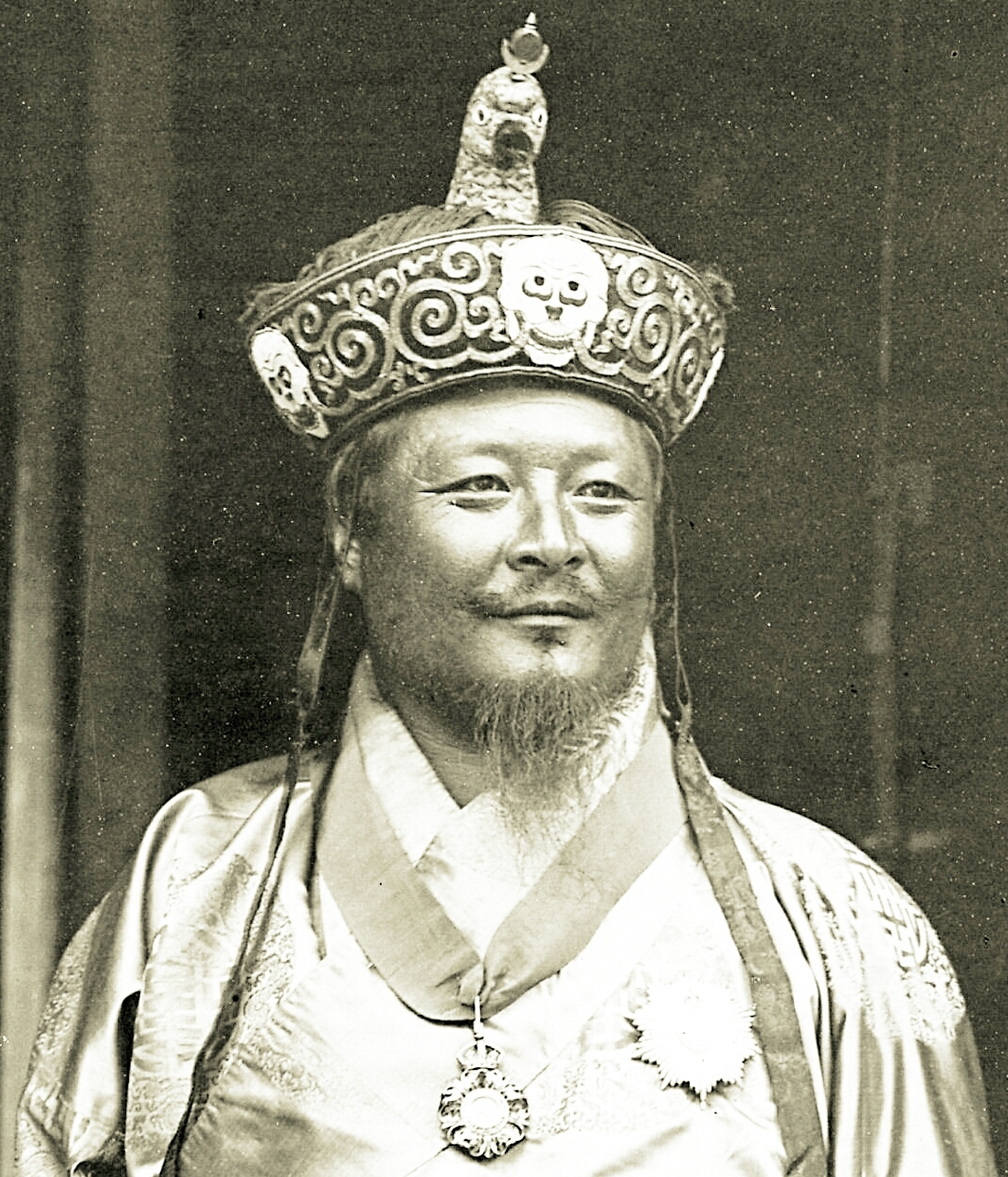
- Wangchuck in 1905

King of Bhutan
- Reign: 17 December 1907 – 26 August 1926
- Coronation: 17 December 1907
- Predecessor: None (hereditary monarchy established, Yeshe Ngodub as Druk Desi)
- Successor: Jigme Wangchuck
- Born: 11 June 1862; Bumthang
- Died: 26 August 1926 (aged 64); Phodrang
- Burial: Cremated at Kurjey Lhakhang
- Spouse: Ashi Ludrong Dolma; Ashi Rinchen Pelmo; Ashi Ngodrup Pemo; Ashi Tsundue Pema Lhamo
- Issue: Princess Sonam Pedron; Princess Chimi Yangzom; King Jigme Wangchuck; Prince Gyurme Dorji; Princess Kencho Wangmo; Prince Karma Thinley Lhundrub
- House: Wangchuck
- Father: Jigme Namgyal
- Mother: Ashi Pema Choki
- Religion: Buddhism

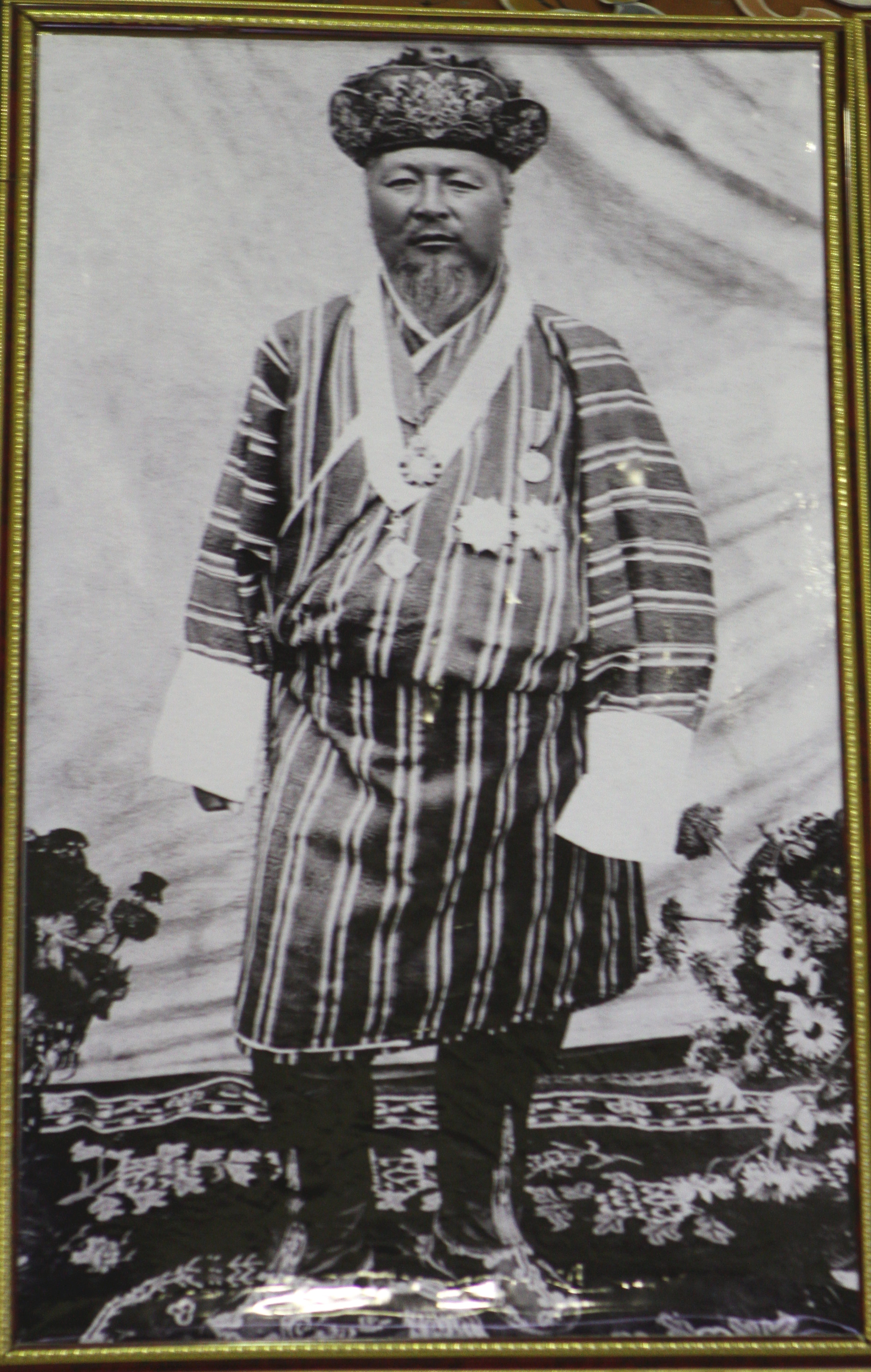
Picture of King Gongsar Ugyen Wangchuck at Paro International Airport

Gongsar Ugyen Wangchuck (Dzongkha: ཨོ་རྒྱན་དབང་ཕྱུག, Wylie: o rgyan dbang phyug; 11 June 1862 – 26 August 1926) was the founder and first king of Bhutan, reigning from 17 December 1907 until his death in 1926. In his lifetime, he made efforts to unite the fledgling country.

== Life ==
=== Embattled boyhood and rise to power ===
Ugyen Wangchuck was born in Wangdicholing Palace, Jakar, Bumthang in 1862. His father, Jigme Namgyal, was the Druk Desi of Bhutan at the time and he was apprenticed at the court of his father in the art of leadership and warfare at a very young age. Because he grew up in an embattled period, Ugyen Wangchuck was trained as a skilled combatant. In 1876, when he was 14, Ugyen joined his father in fighting the rebellious Penlop of Paro, Tshewnag Norbu. In early 1877 his father left Ugyen in Paro to deal with a rebellion in Punakha. Ugyen was kidnapped by one of his father's enemies, Damchö Rinchen. When Jigme Namgyal threatened to kill twelve members of Rinchen's sister's family, Rinchen released Ugyen. Soon afterwards, in 1878, Jigme Namgyal appointed Ugyen as the Penlop of Paro at the age of 16. Soon after, in 1881, Jigme died, and Ugyen took on many of his father's responsibilities. He tried to reconcile with the enemies of his father, offering gifts to monasteries that disliked Jigme Namgyal, and showing kindness and forbearance to those that had personally wronged his father.

Afterwards, Ugyen began work to consolidate power and put those he trusted into key positions of government. In 1882, after a period of strife and civil war, Ugyen assumed the position as the Penlop of Trongsa, a post his father had held. Ugyen continued to further suppress dissent. Two of Ugyen's trusted allies, Alu Dorji and Phuntsho Dorji, rebelled against him and attempted to instate a monk of their choosing as the 55th Druk Desi. This culminated in the battle of Changlimethang in 1886, the last armed civil conflict in Bhutanese history. Ugyen, now 24, held a decisive victory, eliminated all internal strife, making him the de facto ruler of Bhutan.

=== Founding of Buddhist monarchy by unanimous agreement ===
Bhutan had been ruled under 54 successive Druk Desis for 256 years until Buddhist monarchy was established. Ugyen Wangchuck founded the monarchy in 1907, although he had been more or less the actual ruler for more than a decade. On 17 December 1907, Ugyen Wangchuck was elected unanimously by the representatives of the people, the officials and the clergy and enthroned as the first hereditary King of Bhutan in Punakha Dzong. A legal document on the institution of monarchy was attested with signet-rings and thumbprints, on that day. British political officer, Sir John Claude White (1853–1918), represented the British government at the enthronement ceremony. Since that day, 17 December is celebrated as the National Day of Bhutan (Gyalyong Duechen).

=== Foreign relations and official visits abroad ===
Ugyen Wangchuck, then 12th Trongsa Penlop, joined the Younghusband Expedition to Tibet in 1904, as a mediator between Britain and Tibet. His next official visit abroad took place in 1906 when he travelled to Kolkata to meet the Prince of Wales. Penlop Ugyen Wangchuck was not yet formally the King, but the role he took clearly suggests that he was indeed the ruler for all practical purpose for many years before he was crowned King in 1907. King Ugyen Wangchuck's last visit to India took place in 1911, when he went to Delhi to meet King George V (1865–1936), who had been the Prince of Wales when they met earlier in 1906 in Kolkata, the seat of Viceroy of India. The British Political Officer for Bhutan was Sir John Claude White until 1908 when he was succeeded by Charles Alfred Bell (1870–1945). John Claude White developed a deep respect for King Ugyen Wangchuck, and wrote: "I have never met a native I liked and respected more than I do Sir Ugyen. He was upright, honest, open and straightforward." White also took the photographs at the King's 1907 coronation.

King Ugyen Wangchuck was conscious that Bhutan must to be protected through times of regional conflict and rivalries. He updated the treaty of 1865 with the British in 1910, with an additional clause. The new clause was that Bhutan would consult British India in its dealing with third countries. The clause was drawn up in the context of the British suspicion about the influence of the Chinese and Russians in Tibet, and beyond.

=== Spirituality ===
King Ugyen Wangchuck had close relationship with many Buddhist spiritual masters such as Lama Serkong Dorji Chang (1856–1918), Tertön Zilnon Namkha Dorji, and the 15th Karmapa Khachyab Dorji (1871–1922). In 1894, aged 33, he undertook the construction of Kurjey temple, one of the landmarks of Vajrayana Buddhism in the world. The middle lhakhang in Kurjey, with its towering Guru statue, was built in 1894 by King Ugyen Wangchuck. His Majesty was a great benefactor to the dratshangs (monastic bodies) throughout the country. As part of his vision for scholarship and education of young Bhutanese, he sent two groups of Bhutanese to study up to geshey level in Tibet. Twice, in 1915 and 1917, he sent batches of young monks to Zhenphen Choki Nangwa (1871–1927) in Dokham. They later returned to Bhutan and became influential geshes (doctorate level) and lamas, serving as radiant sources of Buddhist teachings. One of the iconic pilgrimage centres of Buddhism is the Swayambhunath Temple in Kathmandu, a monastic enclave held by Bhutan. It was renovated mostly with King Ugyen Wangchuck's personal funds. Kagyu Lama Togden Shacha Shri (1853–1919), with whom King Ugyen Wangchuck corresponded a great deal, supervised the renovation on behalf of King Ugyen Wangchuck.

=== Western schools ===
King Ugyen's commitment was not only confined to spreading monastic education. Following his visits to Kolkata and Delhi, he began to establish schools. The first were established in Lame Goenpa and Wangducholing, with 14 Bhutanese boys from both eastern and western Bhutan. Later, the number increased to 46. By then, students were being sent to missionary schools in Kalimpong. Those members of the first batch of students became important officials in the 1930s and 1940s. King Ugyen took the initiative to sow the seeds of western education, as well as strengthen the roots of dharma in Bhutan.

=== Death ===
On 21 August 1926, aged 64, King Ugyen died at Thinley Rabten Palace in Wangdue Phodrang in the lap of his eldest son. Before his demise he sent large donations to the Central Monastic Body in Punakha and asked his remains to be cremated at the Kurjey Lhakhang in Bumthang.

== Honours ==
=== Foreign honours ===
- British Raj:
  - Knight Grand Commander of the Order of the Indian Empire (GCIE) (01/01/1921) 1921 New Year Honours
  - Knight Commander of the Order of the Star of India (KCSI) (12/12/1911)
  - Knight Commander of the Order of the Indian Empire (KCIE) (02/01/1905) 1905 New Year Honours
  - Recipient of the Delhi Durbar Gold Medal (12/12/1911)

== Ancestors of Ugyen Wangchuck ==
Ugyen Wangchuck came from the distinguished Nyö clan, a noble family from central Bhutan with deep roots in both political leadership and Buddhist tradition. This background played a key role in shaping his future as the country's first hereditary monarch.

His father, Jigme Namgyal (c.1825–1881), served as the 48th Druk Desi (secular ruler) of Bhutan and held the powerful post of Penlop of Trongsa. He was known for his military skills and efforts to unify the country during a time of internal conflict. Ugyen's mother, Ashi Pema Choki, belonged to a respected family in Bumthang and was closely connected to prominent religious figures.

Jigme Namgyal's father, Dasho Pila Gonpo Wangyal, held an important position in Trongsa, though little detailed information about him survives. His role in local governance, however, helped lay the foundation for his family's rise to national prominence.

On his mother's side, Ugyen Wangchuck was also linked to Bhutan's spiritual heritage. His maternal relatives included influential lamas and scholars from Bumthang, a region long known for its contribution to Vajrayana Buddhism. This blend of political authority and spiritual legitimacy helped strengthen Ugyen Wangchuck's support among both secular and monastic communities.

The Nyö clan itself is believed to have Tibetan roots, with ancestors who settled in Bhutan centuries earlier. Over generations, the clan formed alliances with other noble families and religious institutions, allowing them to maintain a central role in Bhutanese affairs throughout the 19th and early 20th centuries.

== Footnotes ==
Ugyen Wangchuck House of Wangchuck Born: 11 June 1862 Died: 26 August 1926
Regnal titles
Preceded by None (Hereditary monarchy created)	King of Bhutan; 17 December 1907 – 21 August 1926	Succeeded by Jigme Wangchuck
