= Ashi (title) =

Bhutanese honorific literally meaning "Lady"

Ashi (Dzongkha: ཨ་ཞེ་; Wylie: A-zhe), also spelled Ashe or Azhi, is a Bhutanese honorary title literally meaning "Lady". The title is prefixed to the given name, and is borne by female Bhutanese nobility and by female members of the Bhutanese royal family. The masculine form is Dasho (Dzongkha: དྲག་ཤོས་; Wylie: drag-shos; "superior, best"), meaning "Lord", which is held by all Members of Parliament; a number of senior officials, including deputy ministers and district magistrates; senior civil servants and others as a form of Royal award (very much like a British Baronetcy), and by courtesy prominent landowners. Ashi can also mean "Miss" although that is not the intended use of the term. It is similar to the Arabic title Lalla also meaning Lady held by noblewomen (Moulay or Sidi -Lord- for noblemen). ‘Ashi’ is also a widely used term to refer to an ‘Elder sister’ especially in the Haa and Paro regions of Bhutan.

== As royal title ==
When borne by daughters of the Bhutanese Sovereign, the title Ashi however has the connotation and status of "Princess" and is used in combination with the style Her Royal Highness. Bhutanese princesses do not have a separate title and the meaning of Ashi therefore depends on the context of usage. This creates sometimes confusion outside Bhutan; to avoid misunderstanding, Bhutanese English-language sources sometimes refer to daughters of the sovereign with the hybrid "Princess Ashi", and their male counterparts as "Prince Dasho".

== See also ==
- Dasho
- Rinpoche
