= Tourism in Bhutan =

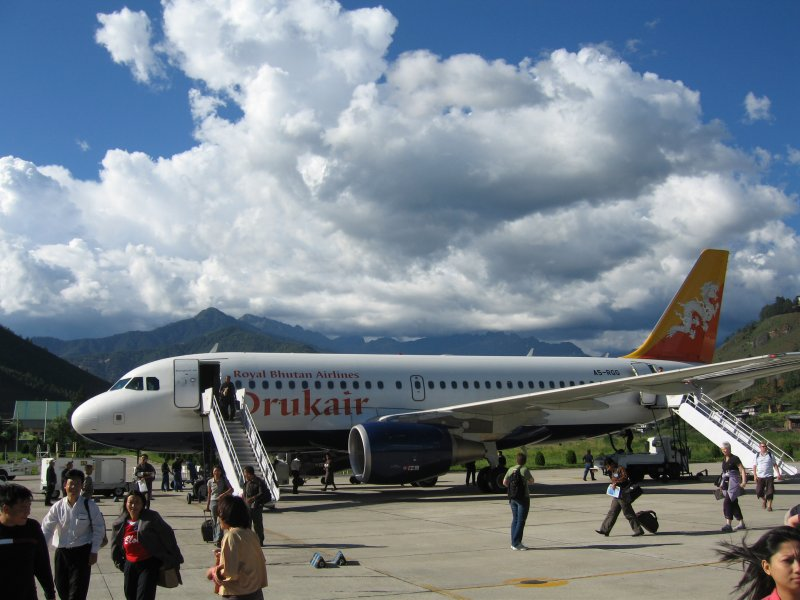
Passengers disembarking from Druk Air's Airbus A319 at Paro Airport

Tourism in Bhutan began in 1974, when the Government of Bhutan, in an effort to raise revenue and to promote Bhutanese unique culture and traditions to the outside world, opened its isolated country to foreigners. In 1974 a total of 287 tourists visited the Kingdom of Bhutan. The number of tourists visiting Bhutan increased to 2,850 in 1992, and rose dramatically to 7,158 in 1999. By the late 1980s tourism contributed over US$2 million in annual revenue.

Though open to foreigners, the Bhutanese government is aware of the environmental impact tourists can have on Bhutan's unique and virtually unspoiled landscape and culture. Accordingly, they have restricted the level of tourist activity from the start, preferring higher-quality tourism. Initially, this policy was known as "high value, low volume" tourism. It was renamed in 2008 as "high value, low impact", "a subtle but significant shift". While the low impact is guaranteed through the low number of visitors, it is a requirement to be wealthy to travel Bhutan, which leaves room for criticism and the question whether one has to be wealthy to be a "high value tourist". For tourists a US$ 100 per person per day fee is imposed, except for Indian, Maldivian, and Bangladeshi nationals. In 2005 a document called "Sustainable Tourism Development Strategy" "placed greater emphasis on increasing tourist numbers by using the country's culture and environment to promote Bhutan as an exotic niche destination attractive to wealthy tourists". The most important centres for tourism are in Bhutan's capital, Thimphu, and in the western city of Paro, Taktshang, a cliff-side monastery (called the "Tiger's Nest" in English) overlooking the Paro Valley, is one of the country's attractions. This temple is sacred to Buddhists. Housed inside the temple is a cave in which the Buddhist Deity who brought Buddhism to Bhutan meditated for 90 days in order to spread Buddhism. The temple has been standing for well over a thousand years.

In order to grow and promote tourism while encouraging sustainability and community development, the Department of Tourism (DoT) launched the "Friends of Tourism" initiative on 28 December 2024 at the Changyul Park to celebrate a historic milestone for Bhutan’s tourism industry—the Druk Thuksey Medal conferred to the industry by His Majesty The King. The program's goal is to bring people and organisations together as partners in order to support Bhutan's goals, develop the country's tourism industry, and provide meaningful experiences. Additionally, the DoT started a monthly tourism bulletin to update stakeholders on developments in the sector. According to the bulletin report, 15,990 tourists visited Bhutan in November 2024. Of these, 7,034 were international tourists, while 8,956 were from India. An estimated 7,986 visitors arrived via Paro International Airport, 8,018 via the Phuentsholing Integrated Check Post, 41 by Samdrupjongkhar, and 16 via Gelephu each.

Yearly tourist arrivals in thousands

== Travel operators in Bhutan ==
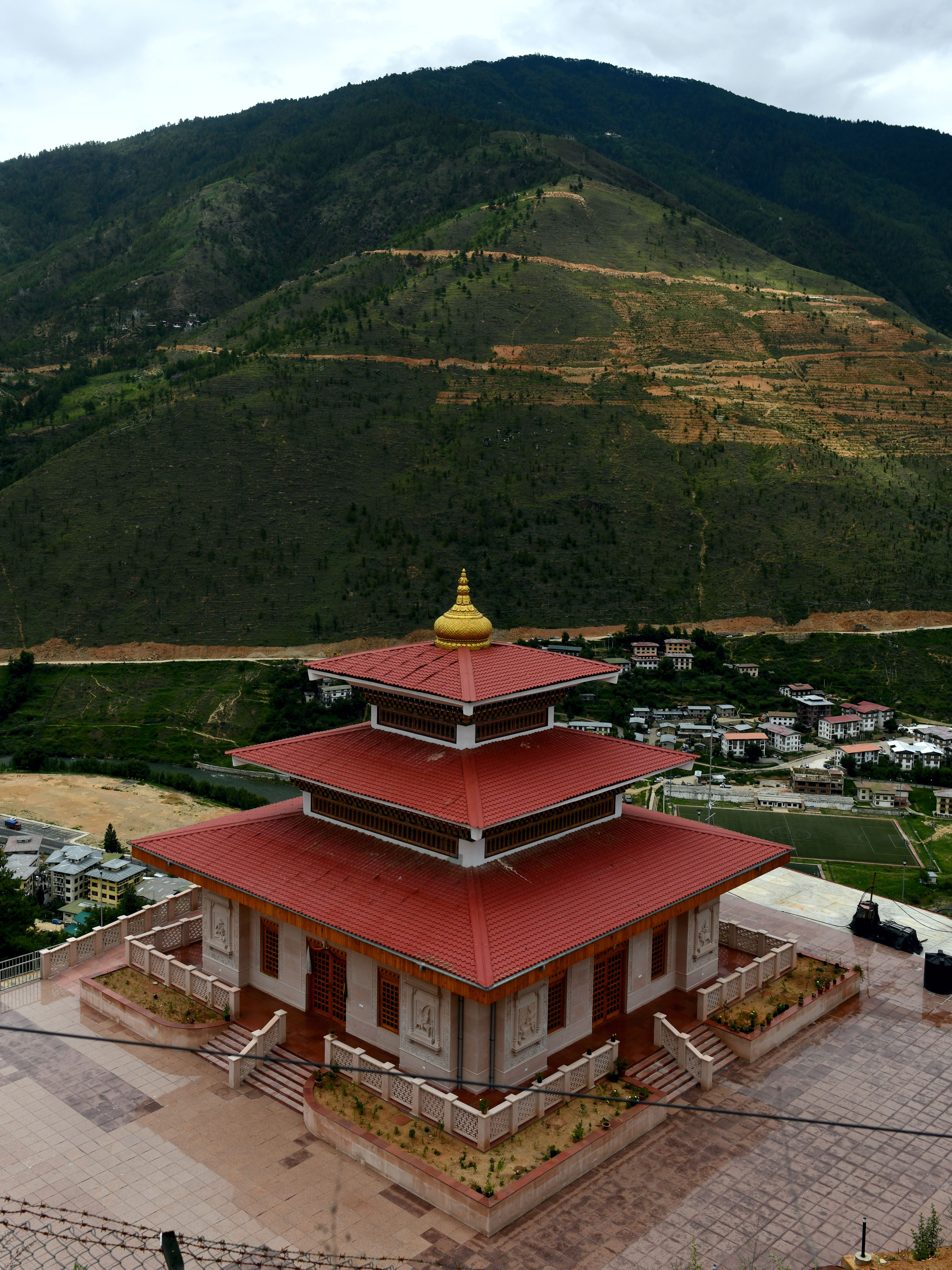
Hindu Dharma Samudaya Temple in Thimphu

The Bhutanese government privatised the Bhutan Tourism Corporation (BTC) in October 1991, facilitating private-sector investment and activity. As a result, as of 2018 over 75 licensed tourist companies operate in the country. Previously, all tourists (group or individual) had to travel on a planned, prepaid, guided package-tour or according to a custom-designed travel-program. Potential tourists had to make arrangements through an officially approved tour operator, either directly or through an overseas agent.

== Visa to Bhutan ==
Bhutan's tourism policy was further revised in June 2022 to maintain its 'High Value, Low Volume' policy and all nationalities had to pay US $200 as a Sustainable Development Fee per night to obtain a visa to Bhutan, while Indian nationals have to pay 1,200 INR to obtain a permit. Starting from August 2023, the SDF decreased to $100, while the amount for Indians, stayed the same. However, travelers can now arrange their own accommodations and itinerary when traveling in the country.

Almost all nationalities need to pre-arrange their visa or permit prior to visiting Bhutan based on the updated visa policy of Bhutan.

== Airlines ==
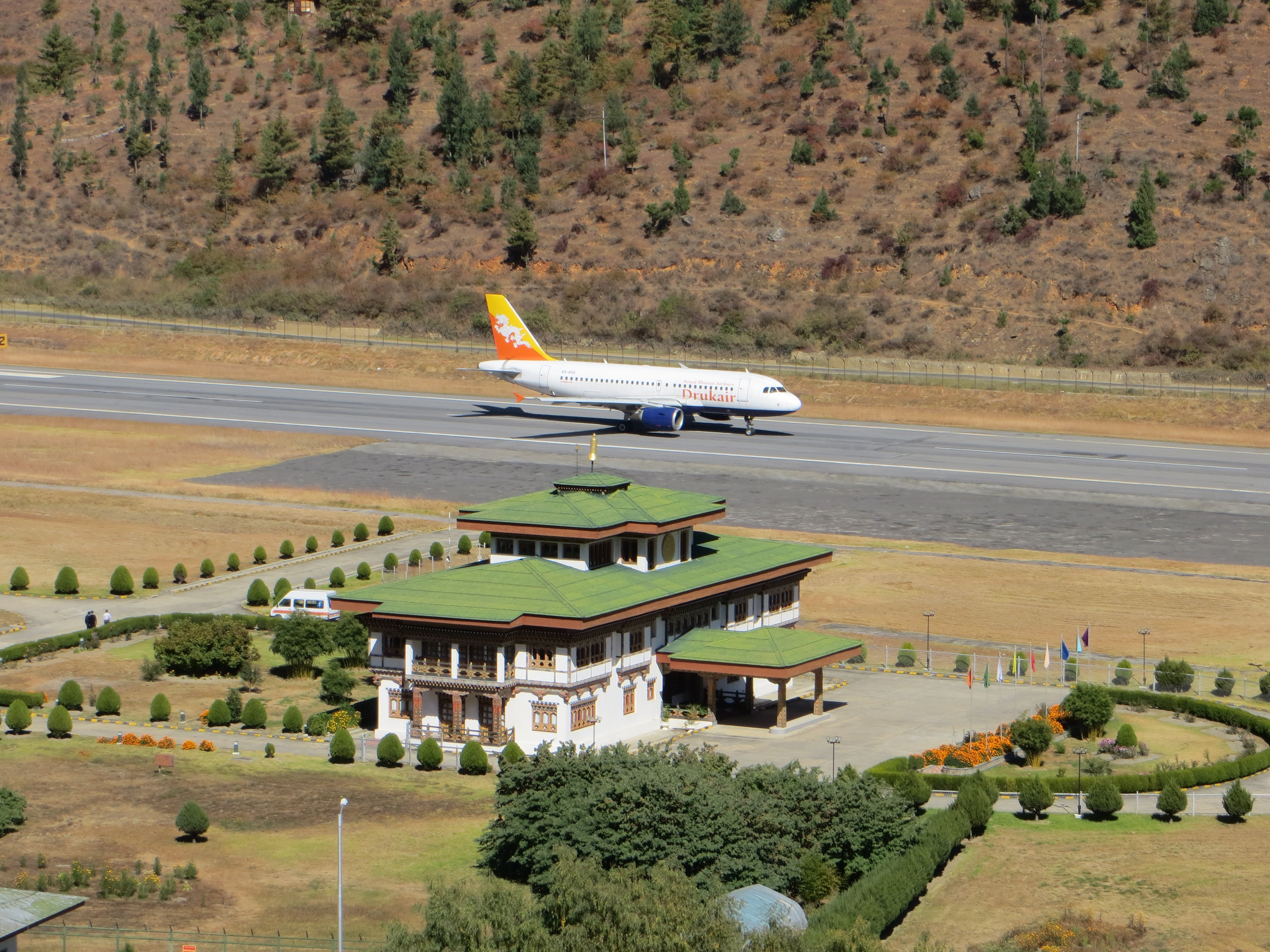
Paro International Airport

Druk Air, founded in 1981, used to be the only airline operating flights in Bhutan, until the liberalization of the aviation industry with the introduction of Bhutan Airlines in December 2011.

== Arrivals by country ==
In 2019, the country saw its highest number of tourists yet, at more than 315,000 people. The growth was boosted by the Asia-Pacific market, notably from India, Thailand, Vietnam, Philippines, Australia, Japan, China, Singapore, Bangladesh, Malaysia and South Korea. Western markets also increased, notably from the United States, United Kingdom, Germany, and France.

Most visitors arriving to Bhutan on a short-term basis were from the following countries:

Country or territory	2019	2018	2017	2016	2015	2014	2013	2012
India	230,381	191,836	172,751	114,301	—N/a	—N/a	—N/a	—N/a
Bangladesh	13,016	10,450	10,536	7,753	—N/a	—N/a	—N/a	—N/a
United States	11,707	10,561	9,220	7,292	7,137	7,291	6,997	6,102
China	7,564	6,878	6,421	9,208	9,399	8,111	4,827	3,816
South Korea	998	6,048	1,035	—N/a	—N/a	—N/a	—N/a	
Singapore	4,744	3,886	4,129	3,015	2,587	1,720	2,051	
United Kingdom	4,241	3,585	3,246	3,124	2,958	2,680	2,309	2,491
Thailand	4,086	3,886	4,047	4,177	3,778	12,105	3,527	3,617
Germany	3,375	3,422	2,970	2,297	2,498	2,971	2,770	2,895
Australia	3,153	2,739	2,249	1,818	1,833	2,037	2,062	1,950
Japan	3,010	2,674	2,744	4,833	2,437	2,707	4,035	7,029
Malaysia	2,761	3,140	2,956	1,967	1,546	2,067	2,054	1,312
Vietnam	2,072	1,961	1,423	—N/a	—N/a	—N/a	—N/a	—N/a
France	1,953	1,773	1,545	1,501	1,563	1,636	1,572	1,863
Philippines	1,912	1,089	1,101	—N/a				
Canada	1,870	1,807	1,524	1,110	—N/a	—N/a	—N/a	—N/a
Spain	1,659	1,397	1,142	—N/a	—N/a	—N/a	—N/a	—N/a
Taiwan	—N/a	1,496	1,491	1,812	—N/a	—N/a	—N/a	—N/a
Switzerland	—N/a	1,379	1,352	—N/a	—N/a	—N/a	—N/a	—N/a
Italy	—N/a	1,229	978	—N/a	—N/a	—N/a	—N/a	—N/a
Indonesia	—N/a	1,033	—N/a	—N/a	—N/a	—N/a	—N/a	—N/a
Netherlands	—N/a	757	—N/a	—N/a	—N/a	—N/a	—N/a	—N/a
Others	20,007		—N/a	—N/a	—N/a	—N/a	—N/a	—N/a
Total	315,599	274,097	237,529	209,570	155,121	133,480	116,209	105,407

== UNESCO Tentative List of Bhutan ==
In 2012, Bhutan formally listed its tentative sites to the UNESCO World Heritage Centre. It was the first time Bhutan listed its sites to the organization for future inclusion. Eight sites were listed throughout the country.

Site	Image	Location	Proposed criteria	Year Listed as Tentative Site	Description	Refs
Ancient Ruin of Drukgyel Dzong		Paro District	Cultural	2012	The site includes the ruins of a fortress-Buddhist monastery built by Tenzin Drukdra in 1649. In 2016, the Bhutanese government announced that the monastery will be rebuilt to its former glory.	
Dzongs: the centre of temporal and religious authorities (Punakha Dzong, Wangdue Phodrang Dzong, Paro Dzong, Trongsa Dzong and Dagana Dzong)		Multiple	Cultural	2012	The site includes five dzongs significant to Bhutanese history, namely, Punakha Dzong, Wangdue Phodrang Dzong, Paro Dzong, Trongsa Dzong and Dagana Dzong.	
Sacred Sites associated with Phajo Drugom Zhigpo and his descendants		Multiple	Cultural	2012	The site includes Tsedong Phug, Gawa Phug, Langthang Phug, Sengye Phug, Gom Drak, Thukje Drak, Tsechu Drak, Dechen Drak, Taktsang Sengye Samdrub Dzong, Tago Choying Dzong, Lingzhi Jagoe Dzong and Yangtse Thubo Dzong.	
Tamzhing Monastery		Bumthang District	Cultural	2012	The site is the most important Nyingma gompa in Bhutan.	
Royal Manas National Park (RMNP)		Multiple districts	Natural	2012	The site is the oldest national park in Bhutan.	
Jigme Dorji National Park (JDNP)		Multiple districts	Natural	2012	The site is the second largest national park in Bhutan.	
Bumdeling Wildlife Sanctuary		Trashiyangtse District	Cultural	2012	The site is an important bird area in the Himalayas.	
Sakteng Wildlife Sanctuary (SWS)		Multiple districts	Cultural	2012	The site was established to protect a mythical race known as migoi, as well as the wildlife within the site.	

== Criticism of the "high quality, low volume" principle ==
While Bhutan is successful in limiting the numbers of tourists who enter the country, with its principle of "High Quality, Low Volume" it can be argued, that a "high quality tourist" needs to be a wealthy tourist, because the hurdle of visiting Bhutan is mainly posed by the high pricing and not by actual interest or mindfulness.

== See also ==
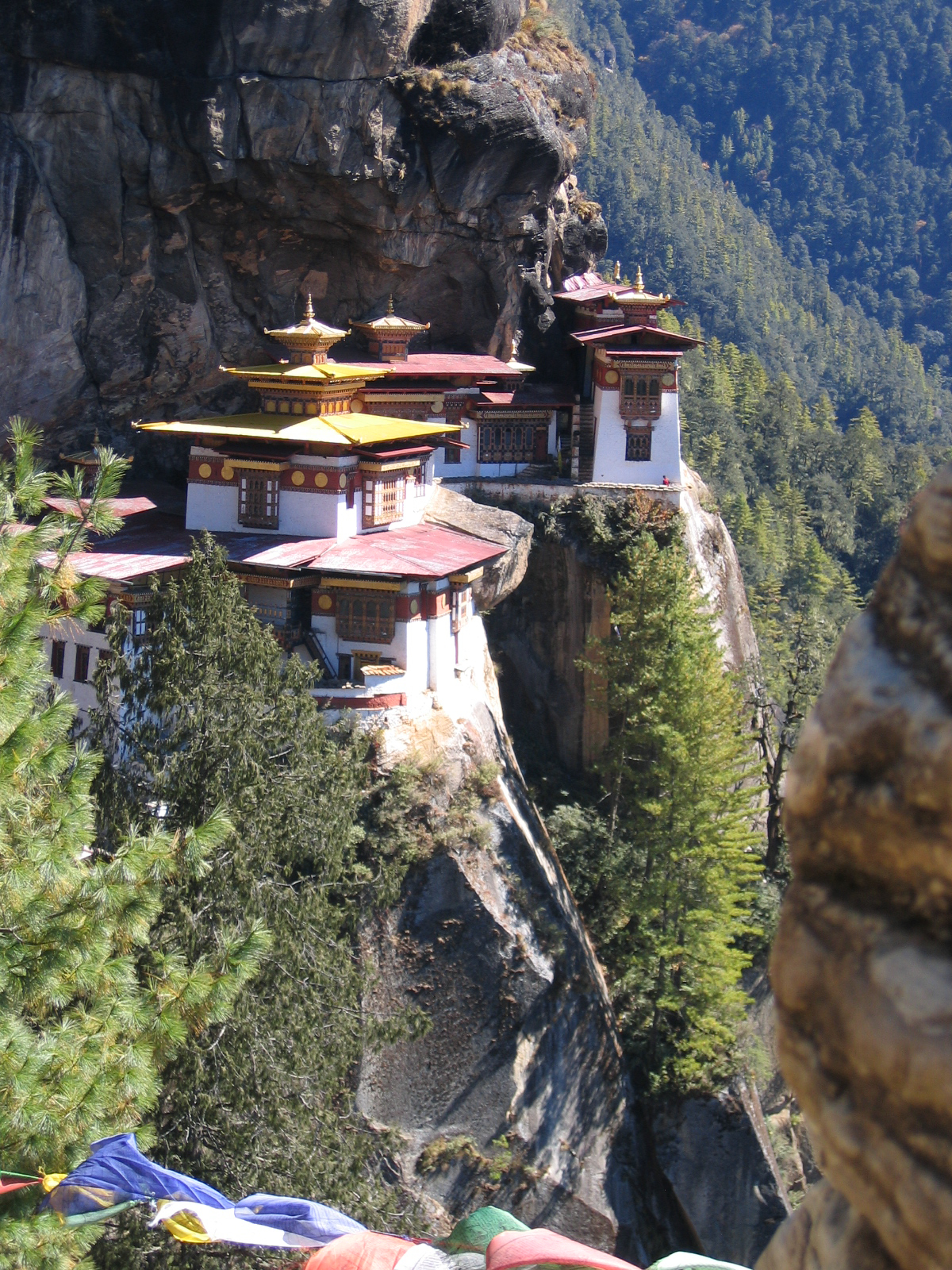
Taktshang Monastery in Paro District

- Transport in Bhutan
- Visa policy of Bhutan
- Trans Bhutan Trail
- List of World Heritage Sites in Bhutan
