= Chagri Monastery =

Buddhist monastery in Thimphu, Bhutan

Chagri Dorjeden Monastery Chagri Monastery
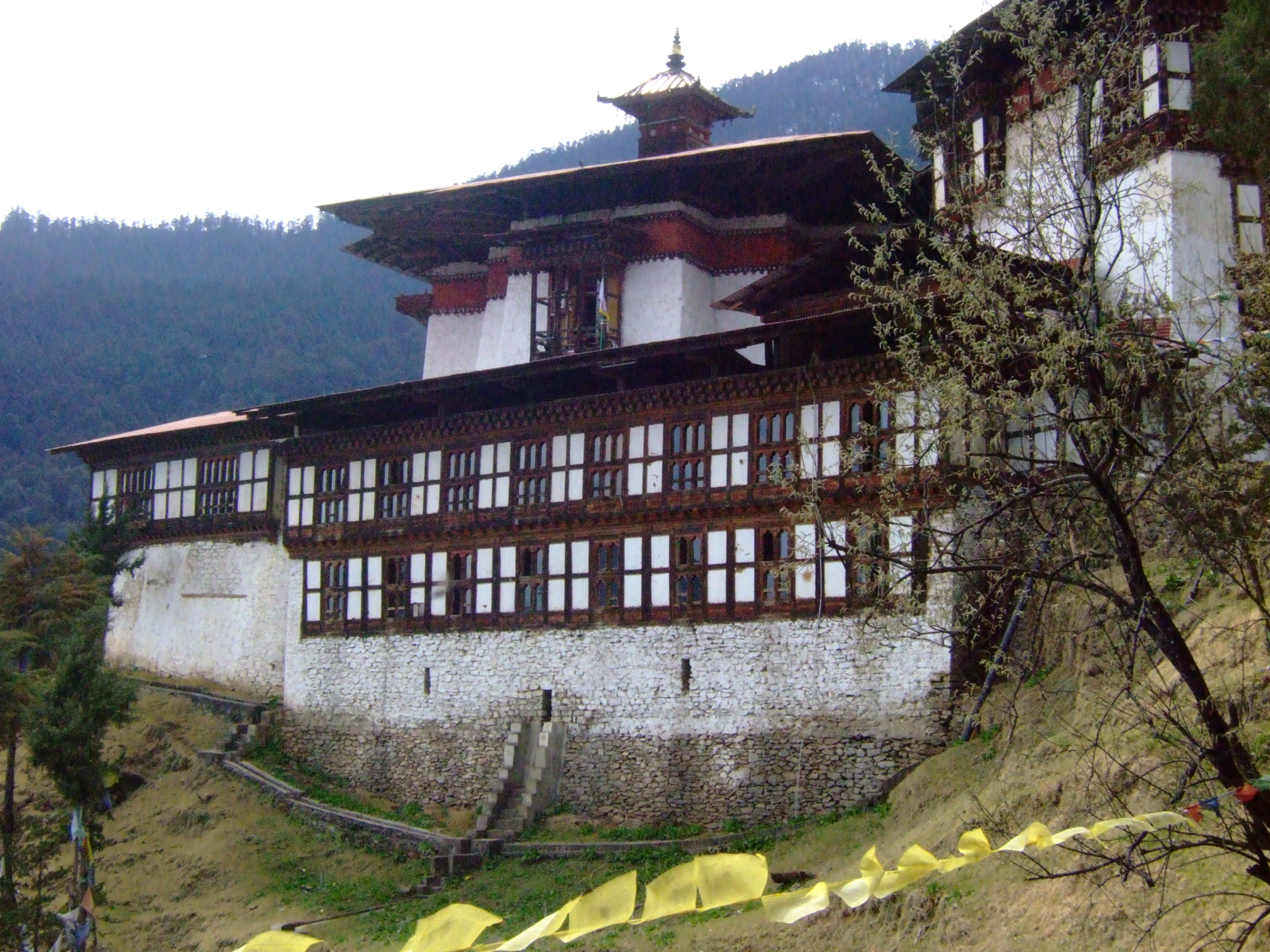

- Location within Bhutan

Religion
- Affiliation: Tibetan Buddhism
- Sect: Southern Drukpa Lineage Kagyu

Location
- Interactive map of Chagri Dorjeden Monastery; Chagri Monastery
- Coordinates: 27°35′54″N 89°38′50″E

Architecture
- Founder: Ngawang Namgyal
- Established: 1620; 406 years ago

Chagri Dorjeden Monastery, also called Cheri Monastery, is a Buddhist monastery in Bhutan established in 1620 by Ngawang Namgyal, 1st Zhabdrung Rinpoche, the founder of the Bhutanese state.

The monastery, now a major teaching and retreat center of the Southern Drukpa Lineage of the Kagyu school of Tibetan Buddhism, is located at the northern end of the Thimphu Valley about 15 kilometres (9.3 mi) from the capital. It sits on a hill above the end of the road at Dodeyna and it takes about an hour to walk up the steep hill to reach the monastery from there.

According to Bhutanese religious histories, the place was first visited by Padmasambhava in the 8th century. In the 13th century it was visited by Phajo Drugom Zhigpo the Tibetan Lama who first established the Drukpa Kagyu tradition in Bhutan. Johnsingh (2005) describes the beauty of the place and the occurrence of goral there.

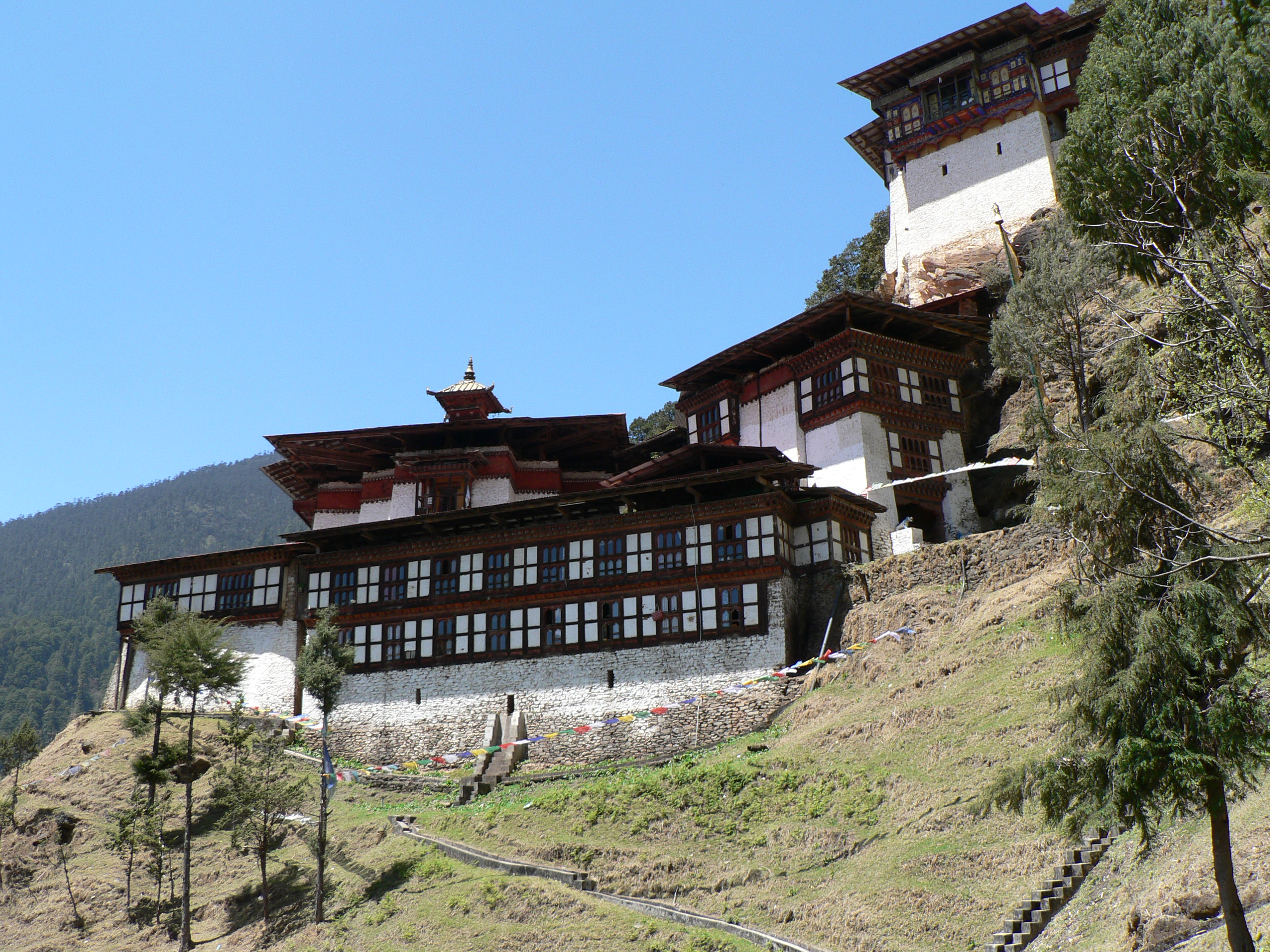
Chagri Monastery, Bhutan

Chagri Dorjeden was the first monastery established in Bhutan by Ngawang Namgyal in 1620 when he was 27 years old. The Zhabdrung spent three years in a strict retreat at Chagri and resided there for many periods throughout the rest of his life. It was at Chagri in 1623 that he established the first Drukpa monastic order in Bhutan.

In 1705, the 7th Druk Desi, Umze Peljor, retired to Chagri Monastery, where he lived until he died in 1707.

== History ==
Cheri initiated a new chapter in the history of the Drukpa school. As soon as the temple was finished and the reliquary stupa installed, Zhabdrung introduced a monastic community of 30 monks according to the constitutional and procedural framework he had created for his first monastic community in Ralung. These monks and the lay devotees, who gathered in Cheri, were taught by Lhawang Lodoe, who passed down the Drukpa teachings transmitted to him by Pema Karpo.

At the age of 33, he sent out edicts bearing his emblem of Ngachudruma, declaring 'all gods, humans and spirits of the Lhomonkhazhi, from this day, fall under the dominion of the great magician Nagwang Namgyal and everyone must heed to his words'.

== Sources ==
- Karma Phuntsho (2013). The History of Bhutan. Nodia: Random House India. ISBN 9788184003116.
- Ardussi, John (2004); Formation of the State of Bhutan ('Brug gzhung) in the 17th century and its Tibetan Antecedents in Journal of Bhutan Studies, Vol 11 2004, Centre for Bhutan Studies, Thimphu.
- Dargye, Yonten and Sørensen, P.K. (2001); The Biography of Pha 'Brug-sgom Zhig-po called The Current of Compassion. Thumphu: National Library of Bhutan. ISBN 99936-17-00-8
- Dargye, Yonten (2001). History of the Drukpa Kagyud School in Bhutan (12th to 17th Century A.D.). Thimphu. ISBN 99936-616-0-0.
- Dorji, Sangay (Dasho) (2008). The Biography of Zhabdrung Ngawang Namgyal: Pal Drukpa Rinpoche. Kinga, Sonam (trans.). Thimphu, Bhutan: KMT Publications. ISBN 978-99936-22-40-6.
- Seeds of Faith: A Comprehensive Guide to the Sacred Places of Bhutan (volume 1). Thimphu: KMT Publications. 2008.
- Johnsingh, A. J. T. 2005. A paradise in the Himalaya. Frontline, January, 28: 67–72.
