= The Kingdom at the Centre of the World =

2013 book by Omair Ahmad

The Kingdom at the Centre of the World: Journeys into Bhutan
- Author: Omair Ahmad
- Language: English
- Subject: Travel, History
- Genre: Nonfiction
- Published: 2013
- Publisher: Aleph Book Company
- Publication place: India
- Media type: Hardcover
- Pages: 231
- ISBN: 978-9-3822-77019
- OCLC: 853618401

The Kingdom at the Centre of the World: Journeys into Bhutan is a non-fiction book by Omair Ahmad.

== Overview ==
The author commenced the writing process for this book in 2005, but it was not until his visit to Bhutan in 2007 that numerous opportunities and venues became accessible for data collection. He acknowledges Dasho Karma Ura and his Centre for Bhutan Studies and GNH Research for supporting the books' on-field research activities.

== Reception ==
Govinda Nair of The Hindu writes, "The strength of the book lies in making Bhutan’s unique history come alive through stories that explain not only how it survives, nay thrives, in its tough neighbourhood, but also how it epitomises the concept of ‘national happiness’."

Writing for India Today, Pavan K. Varma writes, "The best part of his book is its methodology. He doesn't give a mechanically chronological narrative of events, but tries to weave history with personal observation, fact with anecdote, trends with personal interaction, and analysis with readability."

IndraStra Global's book review team writes, "One of the book's strengths lies in its exploration of Bhutan's history and the complexities of its modern-day transformation. Ahmad skillfully weaves historical context into his travels, shedding light on Bhutan's monarchy, its pursuit of Gross National Happiness, and its delicate balance between tradition and progress."
