= Karma Phuntsho =

Bhutanese scholar

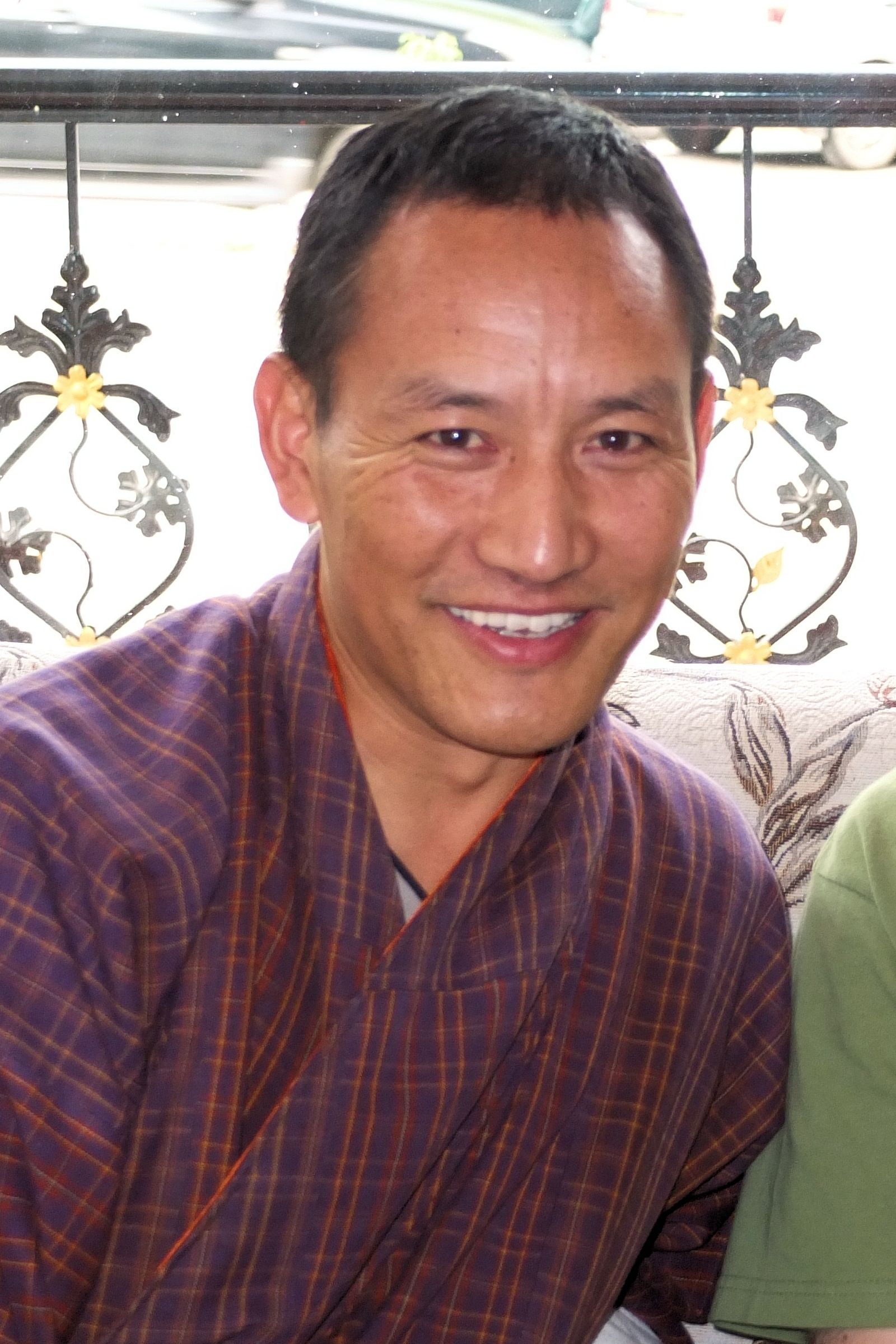
- Born: Ura, Bumthang, Bhutan

Karma Phuntsho (Dzongkha: ཀརྨ་ཕུན་ཚོགས) is a former monk and Bhutanese scholar who specialises in Buddhism, Tibetan & Himalayan Studies and Bhutan, and has published a number of works including eight books, translations, book reviews and articles on Buddhism, Bhutan and Tibetan Studies. His The History of Bhutan received Choice Outstanding Academic Title Award in 2015.

== Early life ==
He was born in Ura, in the Bumthang district of central Bhutan. He was born as the third child of the Tothchukpo House to his mother who is of Gaden Lam family which traces its origin to Phajo Drugom Zhigpo, the priest who brought Drukpa Kagyu tradition of Tibetan Buddhism to western Bhutan. Karma learnt basic Chokey alphabets and prayers from his father, who is a priest and farmer from the Tsakaling Choje family, which claims descent from Bhutan's saint Pema Lingpa and Tarshong Chukpo, house of Ura. He attended Ura Primary School and Jakar School. Karma spent most of his school winter breaks helping the family cow herder in the neighbouring district of Lhuntse.

In 1986, he moved to Thimphu and had a short spell at Yangchenphug Higher Secondary School before leaving to become a monk and study Buddhism at Chagri Monastery. Later, he went to south India to continue his studies, spending a year at Sera Monastery then ten years at the Ngagyur Nyingma Institute. Since 1994, he has taught Buddhism and related subjects and has served a lecturer at the Ngagyur Nyingma Institute in Bylakuppe.

== Education ==
In 1997, partly he says because young Bhutanese educated in English looked down on monks even though they were very learned, he joined Balliol College Oxford and read for an M.St. in Sanskrit and Classical Indian Religions under Richard Gombrich and Michael Aris, with additional supervision by David Seyfort Ruegg. In 2003, he received a D.Phil. in Buddhist Studies from Oxford University. He worked as a post-doctoral researcher in CNRS, Paris and as a research associate in the Department of Social Anthropology, Cambridge University. He was also the Spalding Fellow in Comparative Religions at Clare Hall and ran The Historical Study and Documentation of the Pad Gling Traditions in Bhutan project subsequently he spent years creating a digital archive of rare Bhutanese manuscripts.

He is founder of the Loden Foundation as well as the Shejun Agency for Bhutan's Cultural Documentation and Research, now part of the Loden Foundation.

== Awards ==
Phuntsho received the Ramon Magsaysay Award in 2024, the first Bhutanese to be given the accolade in more than six decades, for "his invaluable and enduring contributions towards harmonizing the richness of his country’s past with the diverse predicaments and prospects of its present, inspiring young Bhutanese to be proud of their heritage and confident in their future. Beyond his immediate horizon, his work engages all peoples and cultures around the world facing the same challenges, reminding them to look back even as they move forward."

== Publications ==
=== Books ===
- Karma Phuntsho (2013). The History of Bhutan. Nodia: Random House India. ISBN 9788184003116.
- Karma Phuntsho (2005). Mipham's Dialectics and Debates on Emptiness: To Be, Not to Be or Neither. Routledge Critical Studies in Buddhism. London: RoutledgeCurzon. ISBN 0-415-35252-5.
- Karma Phuntsho (2015). Twilight Cultures. Thimphu: Shejun. ISBN 978-999-36-1104-2.
- Karma Phuntsho (2015). The Autobiography of Terton Pema Lingpa. Thimphu: Shejun. ISBN 978-999-36-5322-6.
- Karma Phuntsho (2015). The Biography of Thugse Dawa Gyaltshen. Thimphu: Shejun. ISBN 978-999-36-5323-3.
- Karma Phuntsho (2015). The Biography of Gyalse Pema Thinley. Thimphu: Shejun. ISBN 978-999-36-5324-0.
- Karma Phuntsho (1997). ཚད་མའི་བསྟན་བཅོས་རིགས་པའི་ཐེམ་སྐས། [Steps to Valid Reasoning: A Treatise on Logic and Epistemology (textbook)] (in Tibetan). Byallakuppe: Ngagyur Nyingma Institute.

=== Articles ===
- Karma Phuntsho (2007). "Ju Mi pham rNam rgyal rGya mtsho: His Position in the Tibetan Religious Hierarchy and a Synoptic Survey of His Contributions". In Prats, Ramon N. (ed.). The Pandita and the Siddha: Tibetan Studies in Honour of E. Gene Smith. New Delhi: Amnye Machen Institute. ISBN 978-81-86227-37-4.
- Karma Phuntsho (2007). "The Marriage of the Media and Religion: For Better or Worse". In Karma Ura (ed.). Media and Public Culture:Proceedings of the Second International Seminar on Bhutan Studies (PDF). Thimphu: Centre for Bhutan Studies. pp. 19–30. ISBN 978-99936-14-41-8.
- Karma Phuntsho (August 2005). "Shifting Boundaries: Pramāṇa and ontology in Dharmakīrti's epistemology" (PDF). Journal of Indian Philosophy. 33 (4). Springer: 401–419. doi:10.1007/s10781-004-3998-0. S2CID 169766566.
- Karma Phuntsho (2004). "Echoes of Ancient Ethos: Reflections on Some Popular Bhutanese Social Themes". In Karma Ura; Sonam Kinga (eds.). The Spider and the Piglet: Proceedings of the First International Seminar on Bhutan Studies (PDF). Thimphu: Centre for Bhutan Studies. pp. 564–580. ISBN 99936-14-22-X.
- Karma Phuntsho (2004). "H.H. Khenpo Jigme Phuntsho: A Tribute and a Translation" (PDF). Journal of Bhutan Studies. 11. Thimphu: Centre for Bhutan Studies: 129–136.
- Karma Phuntsho (2000). "On the Two Ways of Learning in Bhutan" (PDF). Journal of Bhutan Studies. 2 (2). Thimphu: Centre for Bhutan Studies: 96–126.

=== Monographs in Classical Tibetan (Choke) ===
- Karma Phuntsho (1996). རྫོགས་པ་ཆེན་པོའི་བཅིང་གྲོལ་གྱི་གཞི། [The Ground for Bondage and Liberation in the rDzogs chen Tradition] (in Tibetan). Byallakuppe: Ngagyur Nyingma Institute.
- Karma Phuntsho (1996). དཔལ་ལྡན་ཟླ་བའི་རང་མཚན་གྱི་གྲུབ་པ་འགོག་པའི་སུན་འབྱིན་རྣམ་གསུམ། [The Three Apagogic Arguments of Candrakīrti against the Proponents of Individually Characterized Existence] (in Tibetan). Byallakuppe: Ngagyur Nyingma Institute.
- Karma Phuntsho (1995). [A Concise Presentation on the Tenets and Two Truths] (in Tibetan). Byallakuppe: Ngagyur Nyingma Institute.

=== Web ===
- Karma Phuntsho (2010-05-14). "In response to Dzongsar Jamyang Khyentse's article". Bhutan Observer. Archived from the original on 2014-11-29.
- Karma Phuntsho (2006-10-13). "Bhutanese Reform Nepalese Criticism" (PDF). Society Switzerland-Bhutan. Archived from the original (PDF) on 2014-11-29.
