= Peljor =

Peljor is a Bhutanese surname. Notable people with this surname include:

- Tashi Peljor (born 1978), Bhutanese archer
- Umze Peljor (died 1707), 7th head of government of Bhutan
