= Omair Ahmad =

Indian writer

- Born: 1974 (age 51–52); Aligarh, India
- Education: Jawaharlal Nehru University
- Occupation: Writer
- Known for: Jimmy the Terrorist

Omair Ahmad is an Indian journalist and writer. His book Jimmy the Terrorist was shortlisted for the 2009 Man Asian Literary Prize.

== Biography ==
Ahmad was born in Aligarh, in 1974. He received his early education at international schools in Saudi Arabia and in Woodstock, Mussoorie India. He has degrees in international politics from Jawaharlal Nehru University in New Delhi and Syracuse University in New York, and has worked as an analyst, a reporter and a political adviser in New Delhi, London and Washington.

His published works include the novels Encounters and The Storyteller’s Tale. The latter is set in India in the 18th century, right after the destruction of Delhi by Ahmad Shah Durrani.

His novel Jimmy the Terrorist was shortlisted for the 2009 Man Asian Literary Prize and went on to win the 2010 Vodafone Crossword Book Award.

He has also written a narrative history of Bhutan, titled The Kingdom at the Centre of the World: Journeys into Bhutan.

His most recent publication was a view on the Ayodhya verdict by the Supreme Court. It says - " In its own way, it is a judgement on the New India, an India where the Supreme Court has judged that reason has no place any longer."

== Bibliography ==
- The Kingdom at the Centre of the World: Journeys into Bhutan (Aleph, travel, 2013)
- Jimmy the Terrorist (Hamish Hamilton, Penguin India, novel, 2010)
- The Storyteller's Tale (Penguin India, novella, 2009)
- Sense Terra (Pages Editor, short stories, 2008)
- Encounters (Tara Press, novel, 2007)
