= Gyalsey Tenzin Rabgye =

Bhutnaese king (1638–1696)

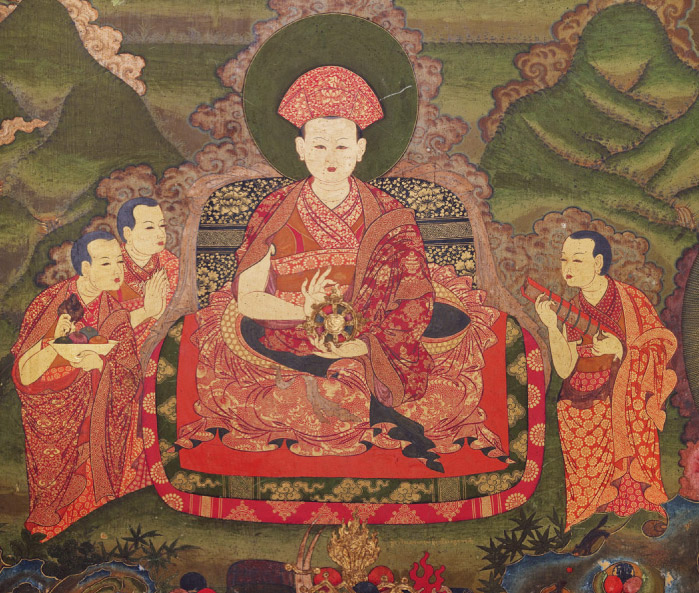
Tenzin Rabgye (1638–96) and Attendants, Wall Painting, Late 17th century, zimkhang, Tango Monastery, Bhutan

Tenzin Rabgye (Dzongkha: བསྟན་འཛིན་རབ་རྒྱས, 1638–1696) was the fourth Druk Desi (secular ruler of Bhutan) who ruled from 1680 to 1694. He is believed to have been the first to have categorized formally the zorig chusum (the thirteen traditional arts of Bhutan). In 1688, he renovated Tango Monastery, approximately 14 kilometres from Thimphu. In 1692, he was first formally categorized during the rule of Tenzin Rabgye (1680–1694), the 4th Druk Desi (secular ruler). In 1692, he visited the sacred cave of Taktsang Pelphug during the Tsechu season and founded a temple there devoted to Padmasambhava. The temple is known as Taktsang Lhakhang (the Temple of the Guru with Eight Names) and was completed in 1694.

Gyalsey Tenzin Rabgye was son of Tshewang Tenzin and Damchoe Tenzima (daughter of the Lama of Chang Gangkha) born in 1638 AD. Tshewang Tenzin was the son of Ngawang Tenzin, the divine son of Drukpa Kunley. Gyalsey received religious instructions from a very young age in the Drukpa Lineage tradition from Zhabdrung and his teacher Damchoe Gyeltshen and was very proficient in the tradition when he ascended the throne of Desi at the age of 31. He also became the 4th Desi at the age of 43. As the 4th Temporal Ruler he creditably ruled the country in accordance with set spiritual and temporal laws.
