= Umze Peljor =

- 7th Druk Desi
- Reign: 1703–1707
- Predecessor: Ngawang Tshering
- Successor: Druk Rabgay
- Died: 1707; Chagri Monastery

Samten Tenzin, better known as Umze Peljor (Dzongkha: དབུ་མཛད་དཔལ་འབྱོར, died 1707) was the 7th Druk Desi or head of government of Bhutan from 1703 until his death. Inexperienced as a politician and of mild character, Peljor served as little more than a co-ruler to the more powerful Gyaltsab (head of state) Kuenga Gyaltshen. Feeling overwhelmed by the factional strife at court, Peljor eventually retired to Chagri Monastery in 1705. For the last years of his life, he remained only nominally in office while effectively living as monk.

== Biography ==
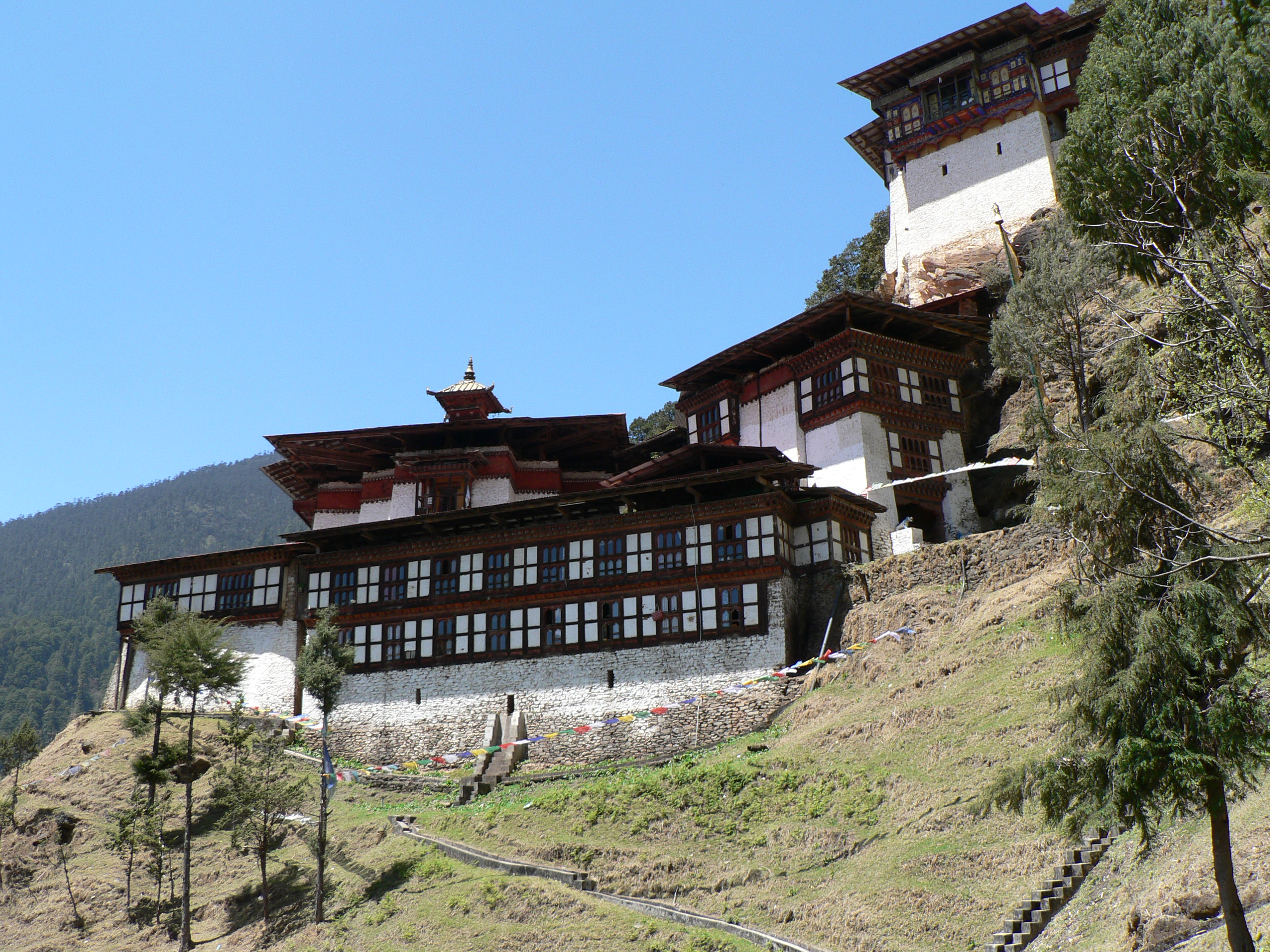
Chagri Monastery, where Umze Peljor lived after his retirement in 1705.

Before his rise to Druk Desi, Peljor served as Umze or precentor at the state monastery, and was thus skilled at religious matters but completely unprepared for a high-ranking governmental office. Appointed ruler after the unexpected death of his predecessor Ngawang Tshering in 1703, Peljor effectively shared his power with the much more influential and powerful Kuenga Gyaltshen, who officially acted as Gyaltsab. As Peljor's reign was also short and obscure, the historian Tenzin Chögyal regarded him as little more than a figurehead, and John Ardussi called him "a virtual nonentity". Pema Tshewang, however, believed Umze Peljor to have been a "easygoing and peaceful character, who ruled righteously", while Karma Phuntsho considered him a "politically naive", but "mild" ruler.

During Umze Peljor's reign the power struggle between the dzongpens Tenpa Wangchuk of Punakha and Druk Rabgay of Thimphu began, resulting in widespread factional strife. Unable to deal with the political imbroglio among the government, Peljor retired to Chagri Monastery in 1705, effectively ceding his remaining power to Kuenga Gyaltshen. Nominally, however, he remained in office until his death in 1707.

After Umze Peljor's death, Druk Rabgay became the first lay Druk Desi, ending the monk rule over the country. Murdering his rivals and Kuenga Gyaltshen, he ushered into a chaotic and violent period of Bhutanese history.

== Bibliography ==
- Karma Phuntsho (2013). The History of Bhutan. Nodia: Random House India. ISBN 9788184003116.
- Ardussi, John A. (1977). Bhutan before the British: A historical study. Acton, Australian Capital Territory: Australian National University.
