= Loden Foundation =

Loden Foundation (བློ་ལྡེན་གཞི་ཚོགས་) is a registered Civil Society Organization (CSO) in Bhutan under the Civil Society Authority (CSOA), promoting education, social entrepreneurship, and Bhutan's culture and traditions since 1999.

== History and beginnings ==
The Loden Foundation was founded on 24 May 1999 by the Bhutanese scholar Lopen Karma Phuntsho who came to study as a graduate student at Balliol College in 1997. He met Mr. Robert Miles, the head porter of the college during his course of studies and Mr. Miles offered to sponsor the school education of a young child in need. Mr. Miles extended the support because he did not finish school education in his youth due to financial circumstances. Karma found a bright girl from a low-income family in rural Bhutan for Mr. Miles to support.

Following this example, many friends of Karma showed interest to support education of children in Bhutan. Meanwhile, Karma's former school headmistress and acclaimed Bhutanese writer Kunzang Choden who was living in central Bhutan, joined him to identify children in need and distribute funds. On 24 May 2000, Karma formalized the process by founding the Loden Foundation with the help of some friends but the organization was constituted in Bhutan in 2003. On 12 March 2010, Loden became one of the first organizations in Bhutan to register as a Civil Society Organization under the Civil Society Organizations Act of Bhutan, 2007, under the leadership of the Civil Society Organizations Authority.

Today, the main office is based in Thimphu and run by a team of 11 employees in the management team and three early learning centre facilitators headed by the President, Mr Sangay Tshering with advisory support from the governing Board of Trustees.

== Loden and its logo ==
Tibetan/Bhutanese word Loden (བློ་ལྡན Wyliee: blo ldan) means "possessing intelligence". It is an epithet of the learned and wise. It is one of the names of the Buddha of Wisdom, of Padmasambhava, who brought Buddhism to the Himalayan region and a term for Bodhisattva, an altruistic being who seeks enlightenment for the whole world.

The Loden logo symbolized giving knowledge and wisdom. It is a Himalayan book in the rectangular poti format. The book in open hand symbolizes the gift of knowledge, which, the Buddha said, is the best gift.

The Loden motto is ཆོས་བདག་མེད་ཀུན་ལ་ཐོབ་ཐང་ཡོད། (chos bdag med kun la thob thang yod), a Buddhist proverb that knowledge/truth is without an owner and everyone is entitled to it.
