= List of World Heritage Sites in Bhutan =

Location of World Heritage Sites in Bhutan

The United Nations Educational, Scientific and Cultural Organization (UNESCO) World Heritage Sites are places of importance to cultural or natural heritage as described in the UNESCO World Heritage Convention, established in 1972. Cultural heritage consists of monuments (such as architectural works, monumental sculptures, or inscriptions), groups of buildings, and sites (including archaeological sites). Natural features (consisting of physical and biological formations), geological and physiographical formations (including habitats of threatened species of animals and plants), and natural sites which are important from the point of view of science, conservation, or natural beauty, are defined as natural heritage. The Kingdom of Bhutan accepted the convention on 22 October 2001. There are no World Heritage Sites in the country, but there are eight on the tentative list. It has not served any terms on the Heritage Committee.

== Tentative list ==
UNESCO lists sites under ten criteria; each entry must meet at least one of the criteria. Criteria i through vi are cultural, and vii through x are natural. In addition to sites inscribed on the World Heritage List, member states can maintain a list of tentative sites that they may consider for nomination. Nominations for the World Heritage List are only accepted if the site was previously listed on the tentative list. In 2012, Bhutan formally listed its tentative sites to the UNESCO World Heritage Centre. It was the first time Bhutan listed its sites to the organization for future inclusion. Eight sites were listed throughout the country.

Tentative sites
Site	Image	Location (district)	UNESCO criteria	Year listed	Description
Ancient Ruin of Drukgyel Dzong	A dzong on a forested hill, there is also a forested mountain behind it.	Paro District	iii, iv (cultural)	2012	The site includes the ruins of a fortress-Buddhist monastery built by Tenzin Drukdra in 1649. Unlike other dzongs which served religious and administrative purposes, Drukgyel only served as a defense against external invasions. It was constructed by Zhabdrung Ngawang Namgyal in a campaign to construct dzongs and unify the country. It is also said to be created to commemorate Bhutanese victory over Mongolian and Tibetan armies. It was destroyed by a fire in 1951, but it still retains many of its stone features.
Bumdeling Wildlife Sanctuary	A Tibetian crane in Bumdeling Wildlife Sanctuary.	Trashiyangtse District	vii, ix, x (natural)	2012	It was created in 1993, when Kulong Chhu Wildlife Sanctuary and the Bumdeling conservation area were merged: later being renamed to Bumdeling Wildlife Sanctuary the following year. It is 1520.61 km^{2}, encompasses a plethora of lakes,
Dzongs: the centre of temporal and religious authorities (Punakha Dzong, Wangdue Phodrang Dzong, Paro Dzong, Trongsa Dzong and Dagana Dzong)		Multiple	Cultural	2012	The site includes five dzongs significant to Bhutanese history, namely, Punakha Dzong, Wangdue Phodrang Dzong, Paro Dzong, Trongsa Dzong and Dagana Dzong.
Jigme Dorji National Park (JDNP)		Multiple districts	Natural	2012	The site is the second largest national park in Bhutan.
Royal Manas National Park (RMNP)		Multiple districts	Natural	2012	The site is the oldest national park in Bhutan.
Sacred Sites associated with Phajo Drugom Zhigpo and his descendants		Multiple	Cultural	2012	The site includes various dzongs.
Sakteng Wildlife Sanctuary (SWS)		Multiple districts	Cultural	2012	The site was established to protect a mythical race known as migoi, as well as the wildlife within the site.
Tamzhing Monastery		Bumthang District	Cultural	2012	The site is the most important Nyingma gompa in Bhutan.

== See also ==
- List of World Heritage Sites in Asia
