= Karma Ura =

Dasho Karma Ura
- Born: Karma Ngawang Ura; 7 April 1961 (age 65); Ura, Bumthang, Bhutan
- Education: University of Edinburgh; University of Oxford
- Organization: Centre for Bhutan Studies
- Notable work: · Hero with a Thousand Eyes
- Honours: Dasho

Dasho Karma Ura (Dzongkha: ཀརྨ) is the President of the Centre for Bhutan Studies and Gross National Happiness Research. He is also an active scholar, writer, painter and historian.

== Early life and education ==
Karma Ura was born in Ura, Bumthang, Bhutan. He completed his undergraduate studies at St. Stephen's College in New Delhi, as well as Magdalen College, Oxford, and MA from Edinburgh University in the United Kingdom. He recently received an honorary doctorate from Nagoya University in Japan.

== Works and achievements ==
Karma Ura worked for the Ministry of Planning for 12 years before becoming the Director of the Centre for Bhutan Studies and GNH Research from its founding in 1999 until 2008 when he became its president. He organized the concepts of Gross National Happiness (GNH), formulated the nine domains of GNH, and led the surveys conducted in 2010 and 2007. He was also the member of Drafting Committee of the Constitution of Bhutan, first enacted in 2008.

Ura was awarded the red scarf and the title Dasho by the Fourth King of Bhutan, Jigme Singye Wangchuck in 2006 and in 2010 the Druk Khorlo (Wheel of the Thunder Dragon). He holds various international roles, including Executive Committee Member of the School of Well-being, Chulalongkorn University, and San Nagarprada Foundation, Thailand, and 2010 Member of the Reflection Group on Global Development Perspectives, Global Policy Forum, Germany. He is also a Member of the Chief Economist's Advisory Panel, World Bank, representing the South Asia Region.

== Personal life ==
He is currently married with two daughters.

== Bibliography ==
=== Novels ===
- The Hero with a Thousand Eyes: A Historical Novel (1995)

=== Non-fiction ===
- Asian Business and Management Practices: Trends and Global Considerations (2014) by Karma Ura and Patricia Ordoñez de Pablos
- Leadership of the wise: Kings of Bhutan (2010) review
- The Spider and the Piglet (Proceedings of the First International Seminar on Bhutan Studies) (2004) by Karma Ura and Sonam Kinga
- The Ballad of Pemi Tshewang Tashi: A Wind Borne Feather (1996)
