= Paro Taktsang =

Buddhist temple complex in Paro, Bhutan

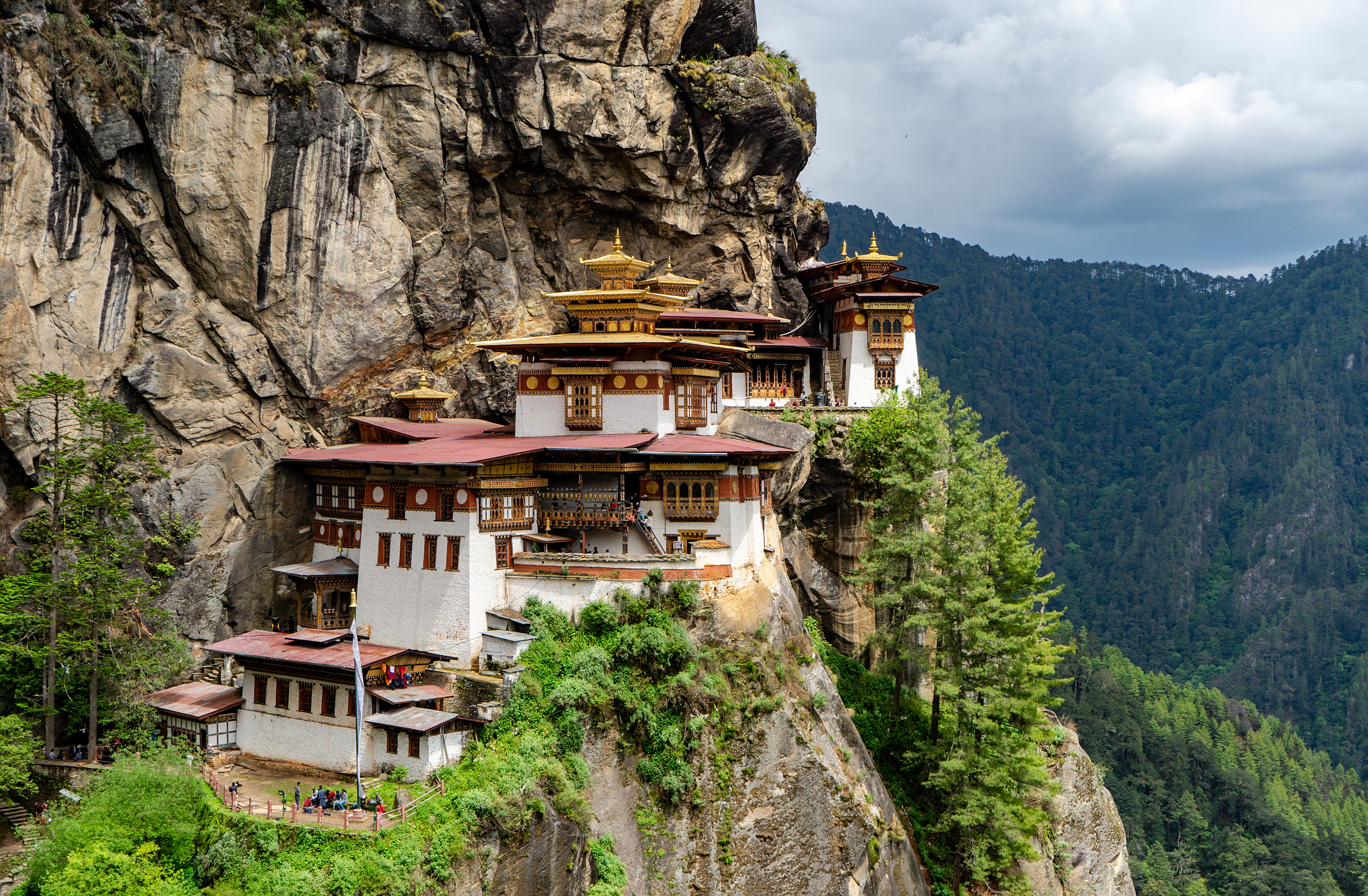
- View of Paro Taktsang

- Location within Bhutan

Religion
- Affiliation: Tibetan Buddhism
- Sect: Nyingma and Drukpa Kagyu
- Deity: Guru Padmasambhava

Location
- Location: Paro Valley, Paro District, Bhutan
- Country: Bhutan
- Coordinates: 27°29′30.88″N 89°21′48.56″E

Architecture
- Style: Bhutanese
- Established: 9th century (as a meditation cave); 1692 (formally built as a monastery)

Paro Taktsang (Dzongkha: སྤ་གྲོ་སྟག་ཚང་, also known as the Taktsang Palphug Monastery and the Tiger's Nest) is a sacred Vajrayana Himalayan Buddhist site located in the cliffside of the upper Paro valley in Bhutan. It is one of thirteen Tiger's Nest caves in which Padmasambhava practiced and taught Vajrayana.

A later monastery complex was built in 1692 by the 4th Druk Desi Tenzin Rabgey around the Taktsang Senge Samdup cave, where Guru Padmasambhava meditated and practised with students, including Yeshe Tsogyal, before departing the kingdom of Tibet in the early 9th century. Padmasambhava is credited with introducing Vajrayana Buddhism to Bhutan. Today, Paro Taktsang is the best known of the thirteen taktsang or "tiger lair" caves in which he and his students meditated.

The shrine dedicated to Padmasambhava, also known as Gu-ru mTshan-brgyad Lhakhang or "the Shrine of the Guru with Eight Names", refers to Padmasambhava's Eight Manifestations and is an elegant structure built around the cave in 1692 by Gyalse Tenzin Rabgye. It has become the cultural icon of Bhutan. A popular festival, known as the Tsechu, held in honor of Padmasambhava, is celebrated in the Paro valley sometime during March or April.

== History ==
=== Background and legends ===
According to the Namthar of the Lhakhang, it is believed that Padmasambhava (Guru Rinpoche) flew to this location from Singye Dzong on the back of a tigress. Guru Rinpoche disguised himself as the wrathful Dorje Drolo, meditated in a cliffside cave, and then subjugated the malicious spirits.

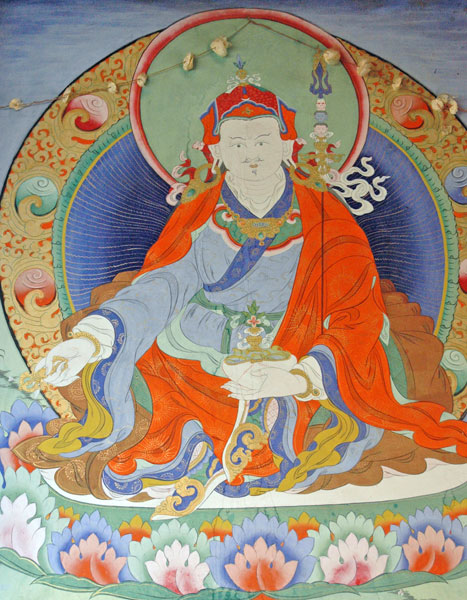
Guru Padmasambhava, founder of the meditation cave. Wall painting on Paro Bridge.

An alternative legend holds that an emperor's former wife willingly became a disciple of Guru Rinpoche (Padmasambhava) in Tibet. She transformed herself into a tigress and carried the Guru on her back from Tibet to the present location of the Taktsang in Bhutan. In one of the caves here, the Guru then meditated and emerged in eight incarnate forms (manifestations), and the place became holy. Subsequently, the place came to be known as the "Tiger's Nest".

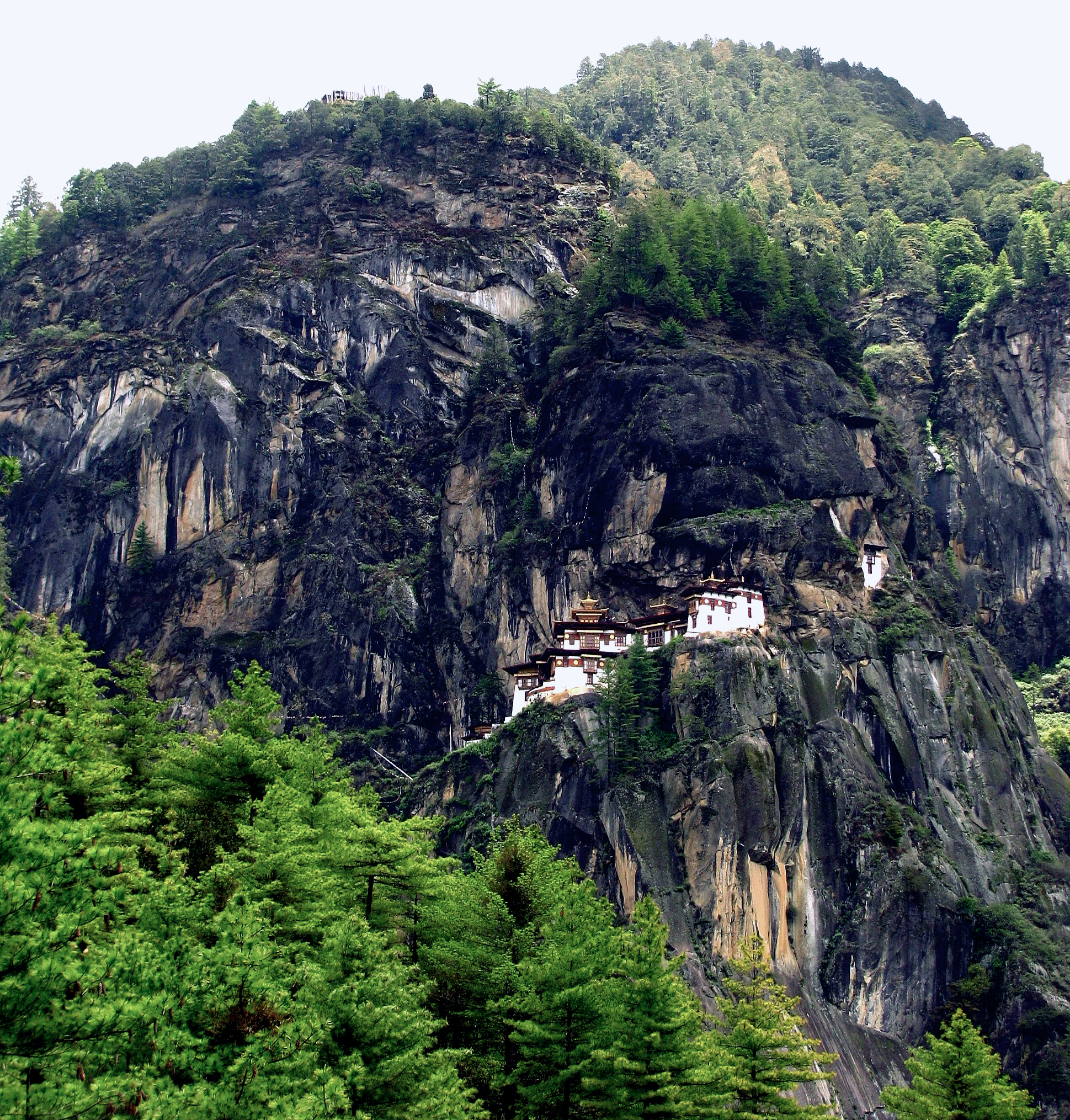
Wider view of the cliffside

The popular legend of the Taktsang monastery is further embellished with the story of Tenzin Rabgye, who built the temple here in 1692. The authors have mentioned that the 8th-century guru Padmasambhava had reincarnated again as Tenzin Rabgye. The corroborative proofs mooted are: that Tenzin Rabgye was seen (by his friends) concurrently inside and outside his cave; even a small quantity of food was adequate to feed all visitors; no one was injured during worship (in spite of the approach track to the monastery being dangerous and slippery); and the people of the Paro valley saw in the sky various animal forms and religious symbols including a shower of flowers that appeared and also vanished in the air without touching the earth.

=== Establishment as a meditation site ===
As noted before, the monastery was built around the Taktsang Senge Samdup (stag tshang seng ge bsam grub) cave, where custom holds that the Indian Guru Padmasambhava meditated in the 8th century. He flew to this place from Tibet on the back of Yeshe Tsogyal, whom he transformed into a flying tigress for the purpose and landed on the cliff, which he "anointed" as the place for building a monastery. He established Buddhism and the Nyingmapa school of Mahayana Buddhism in Bhutan, and has been considered the “protector saint of Bhutan”. Later, Padmasambhava visited Bumthang district to subdue a powerful deity who had been offended by a local king. Padmasambhava's body imprint is stated to be imprinted on the wall of a cave near Kurje Lhakhang temple. In 853, Langchen Pelkyi Singye came to the cave to meditate and gave his name of Pelphug to the cave, "Pelkyi's cave". After he died later in Nepal, his body was said to have been miraculously returned to the monastery by the grace of the deity Dorje Legpa; it is now said to be sealed in a chorten in a room to the left at the top of the entrance stairway. The chorten was restored in 1982-83 and again in 2004.

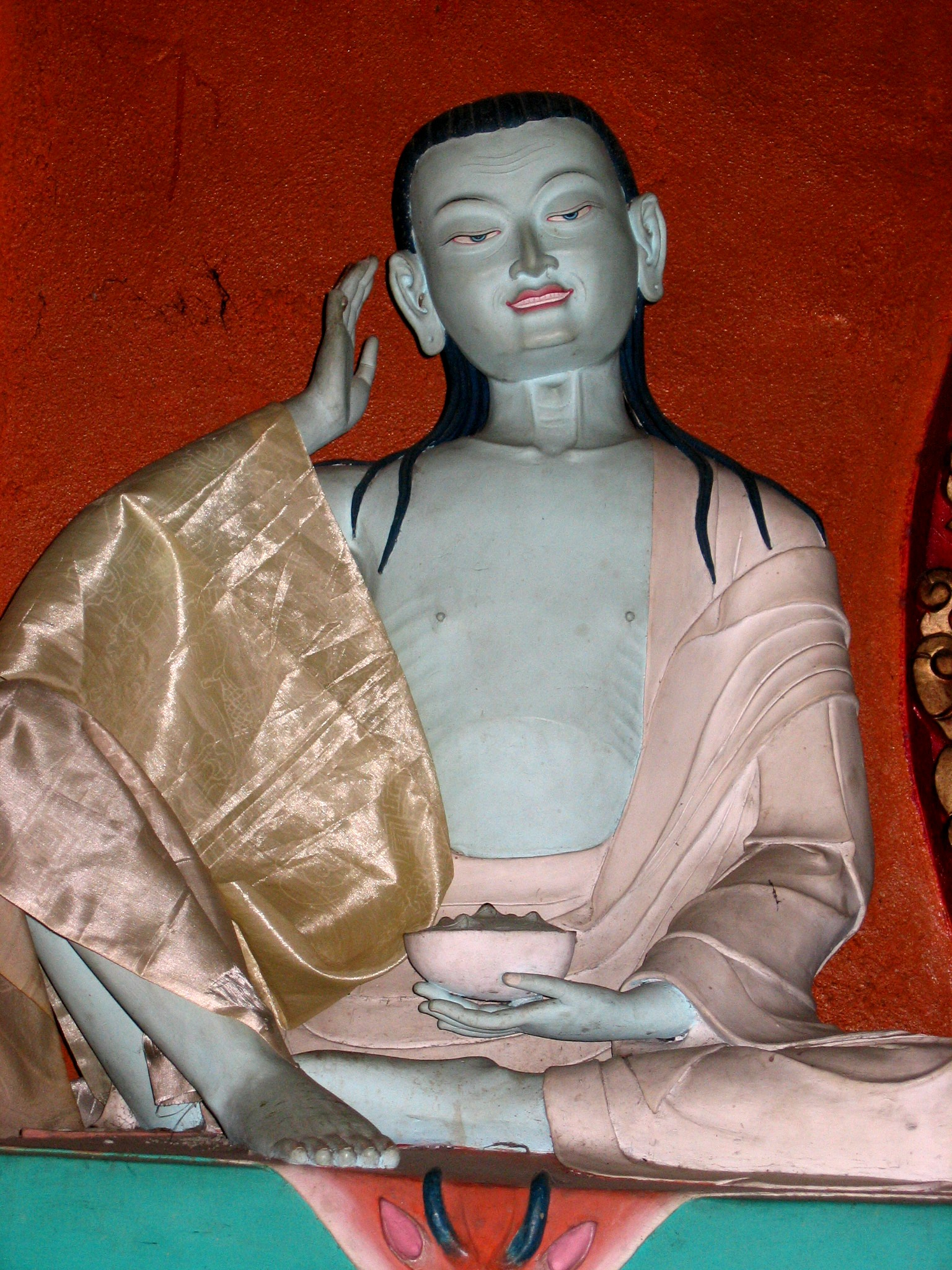
Milarepa (1040–1123), who meditated at the cave in Taktsang

From the 11th century, many Tibetan saints and eminent figures came to Taktsang to meditate, including Milarepa (1040–1123), Pha Dampa Sangye (died 1117), the Tibetan yogini Machig Labdrön (1055–1145) and Thangtong Gyelpo (1385–1464). In the latter part of the 12th century, the Lapa School was established in Paro. Between 12th and 17th centuries, many Lamas who came from Tibet established their monasteries in Bhutan. In the 13th century, Phajo Drugom Zhigpo meditated there. While in meditation, Guru Rinpoche entrusted him with his four fortresses, four cliffs, and four caves in a vision. Therefore, Paro Taktsang Singye Samdrup Dzong is one of the twelve meditation places of Guru Rinpoche entrusted to Phajo. The first sanctuary to be built in the area dates to the 14th century when Sonam Gyeltshen, a Nyingmapa lama of the Kathogpa branch, came from Tibet. The paintings he brought can still be faintly discerned on a rock above the principal building, although there is no trace of the original one. The Taktsang Ugyen Tsemo complex, which was rebuilt after a fire in 1958, is said to date back to 1408. Taktsang remained under the authority of the Kathogpa lamas for centuries until the mid 17th century.

=== 17th century to present: The modern monastery ===
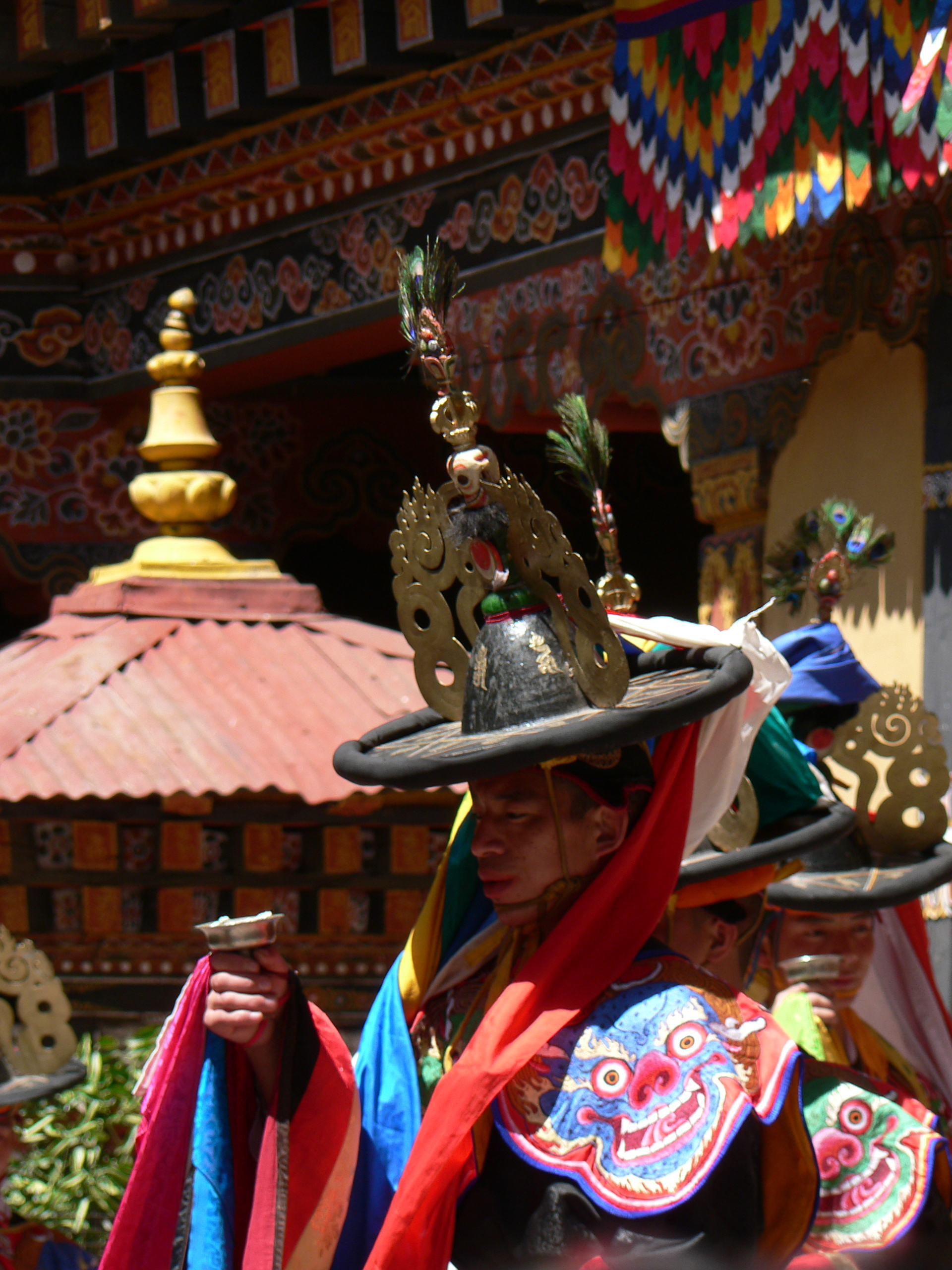
Tsechu – dance of the Black Hat monks initiated by Pema Ligpa of Bumthang

In the 17th century the well-known Tertön Pema Lingpa of Bumthang, who founded many monasteries in various parts of Bhutan, was also instrumental in creating religious and secular dance forms from his conception of the 'Zangdok Pelri' (the Copper Colored mountain), which was the abode of the Guru Padmasambahva (which is the same place as the Paro Taktsang or Tiger's nest). This dance is performed in Paro during the Tsechu festival. But it was during the time of Ngawang Namgyal of the Drukpa subsect, who fled Tibet to escape persecution by the opposing sect of the Gelugpa order (which dominated Tibet under the Dalai Lamas), that an administrative mechanism was established in Bhutan.

In due time, he established himself in Bhutan as a 'model of rulership' and was known as the "Zhabdrung" with full authority. He wanted to establish an edifice at the Taktsang Pel Phuk site. It was during a Tibetan invasion of Bhutan in 1644-46 that Shabdrung and his Tibetan Nyingmapa teacher gTer-ston Rig-’dzin sNying-po had invoked Padmasambhava and the protective deities at Taktsang to give them success over the invaders. He performed the bka’ brgyad dgongs ’dus rituals associated with the celebrations of Tshechu. Bhutan won the war against Tibet. However, Shabdrung was unable to build a temple at Taktsang to celebrate the event, even though he very much wanted to.

The wish of Zhabdrung to build a temple here, however, was fulfilled during the 4th Druk Desi Tenzin Rabgye (1638–96), the first, and only successor of Shabdrung Ngawang Namgyel (Zhabs-drung Ngag-dbang rNam-rgyal), "a distant cousin from a collateral line descending from the 15th century ‘crazy saint’ Drukpa Kunley". During his visit to the sacred cave of Taktsang Pel Phuk during the Tshechu season of 1692, he laid the foundation for building the temple dedicated to Guru Rinpoche called the ‘Temple of the Guru with Eight Names’ (’gu ru mtshan brgyad lha-khang). It was a decision taken by Tenzin Rabgye while standing at the cave overlooking the Paro valley. At this time, he was leading the Tshechu festival of religious dances. At that time, the only temples reported to be in existence, at higher elevations, were the Zangdo Pelri (Zongs mdog dPalri) and Ugyen Tsemo (Urgyan rTse-mo).

=== Fire destruction ===
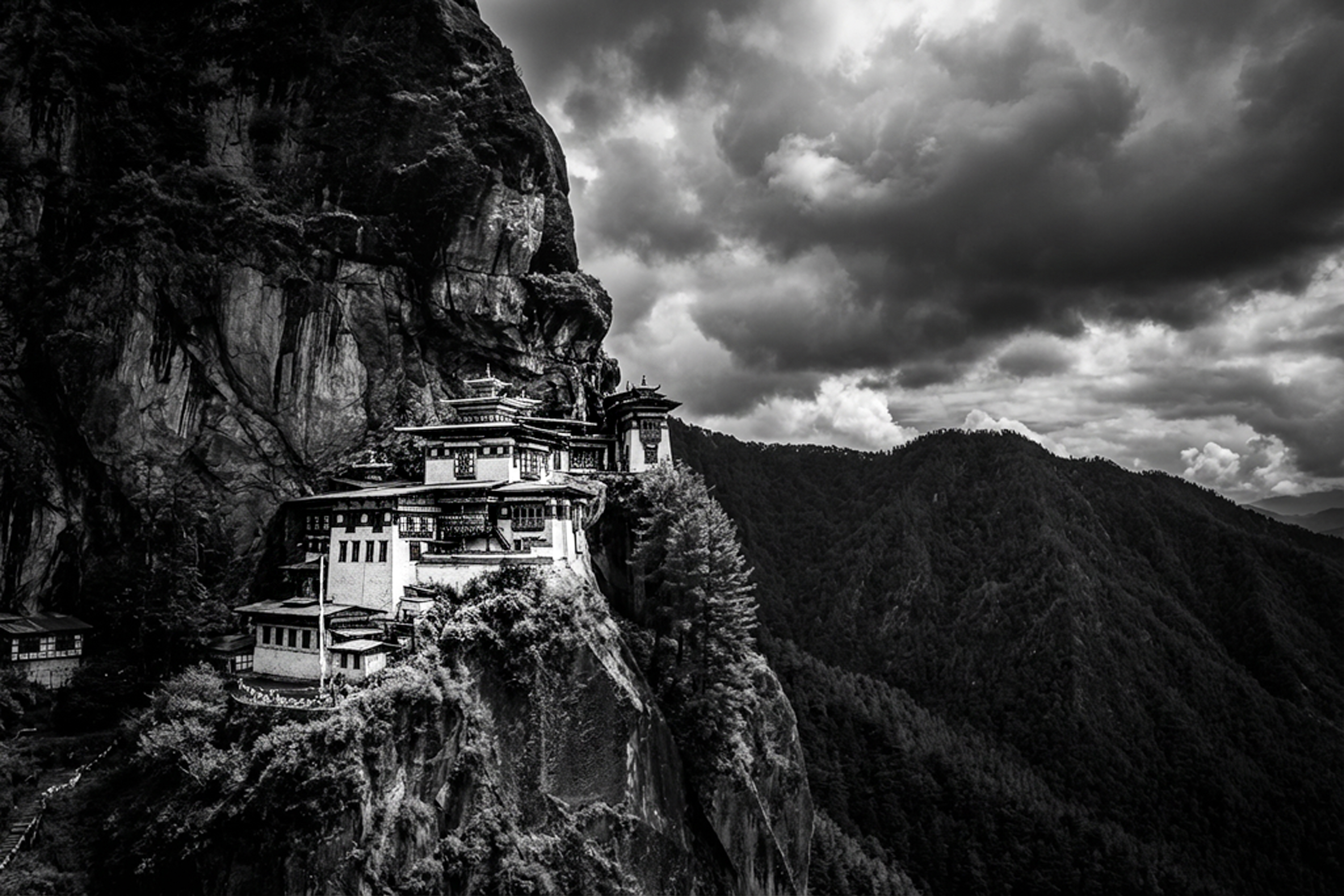
The monastery in high-contrast black and white

On April 19, 1998, a fire broke out in the main building of the monastery complex, which contained valuable paintings, artifacts, and statues. The fire is believed to have been caused by an electrical short-circuit or flickering butter lamps lighting the hanging tapestries. A monk also died during the fire. The restoration works were undertaken at an estimated cost of 135 million ngultrum. The Government of Bhutan and the then King of Bhutan, Jigme Singye Wangchuck, oversaw the restoration of the damaged monastery and its contents in 2005.

== Geography ==
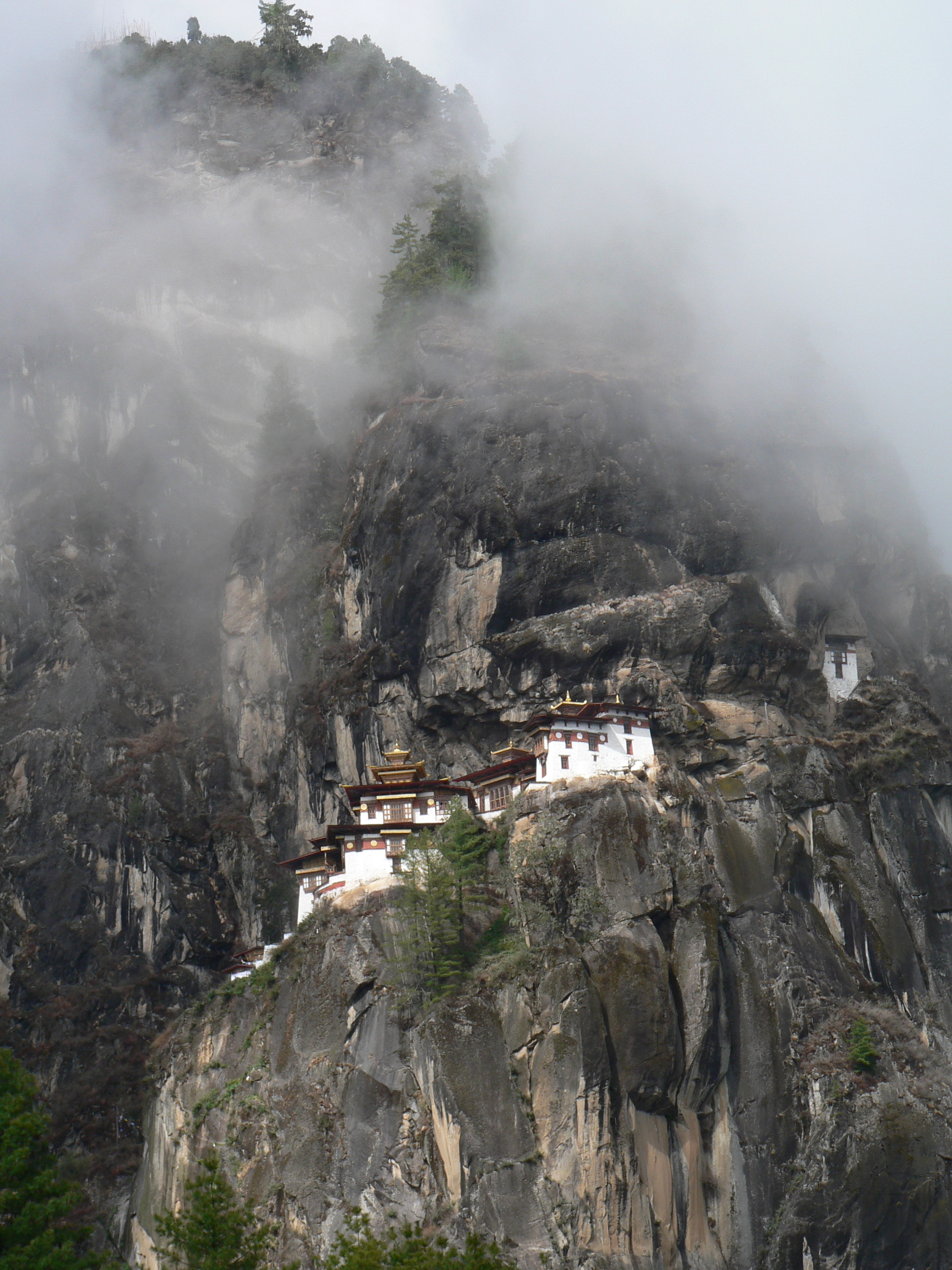
Cloud cover around the monastery

The monastery is located 10 kilometres (6.2 mi) to the north of Paro and hangs on a precarious cliff at 3,120 metres (10,240 ft), about 900 metres (3,000 ft) above the Paro valley, on the right side of the Paro Chu ('chu' in Bhutanese means "river or water"). The rock slopes run nearly vertical, and the monastery buildings are built into the rock face. Though it looks formidable, the monastery complex has access from several directions, such as the northwest path through the forest, from the south along the path used by devotees, and from the north (access over the rocky plateau, which is called the "Hundred Thousand Fairies" known as Bumda (hBum-brag). A mule track leading to it passes through a pine forest that is colorfully festooned with moss and prayer flags. On many days, clouds shroud the monastery, giving an eerie sense of remoteness.

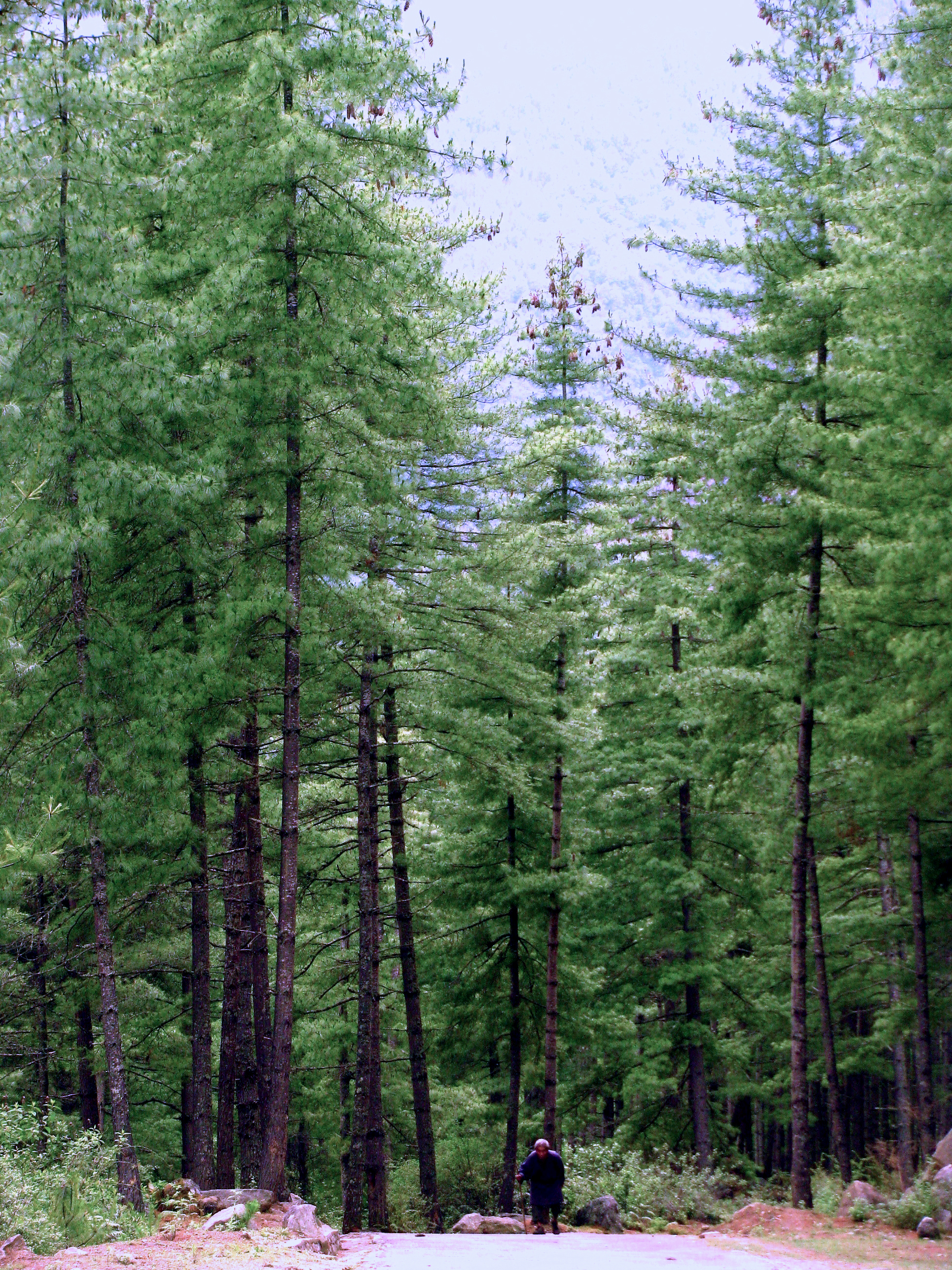
Pine forest in the area

Near the beginning of the trail is a water-powered prayer wheel, set in motion by a flowing stream. The water that is touched by the wheel is said to become blessed and carries its purifying power into all life forms in the oceans and lakes that it feeds into. On the approach path to the monastery, there is a Lakhang (village level monastery) and a temple of Urgyan Tsemo ("U-rgyan rTse-mo") which, like the main monastery, is located on a rocky plateau with a precipitous projection of several hundred feet over the valley. From this location, the monastery's buildings are on the opposite ravine, which is known by the name “Copper-Colored Mountain Paradise of Padmasambhava”. This is the viewpoint for visitors, and there is a cafeteria to provide refreshments. The trek beyond this point is very scenic with the sound of the water fall breaking the silence. Along the trek route, blue pine trees, prayer flags and kiosks selling paraphernalia for worship (such as prayer wheels, temple bells and skulls) are seen. The route is dotted with temples. On this path, a large waterfall, which drops by 60 metres (200 ft) into a sacred pool, is forded over by a bridge. The track terminates at the main monastery, where colorful paintings are displayed. Guru Rinpoche's cave, where he meditated, is also seen. This cave is open for public viewing only once a year.

== Structure ==
=== Exterior ===
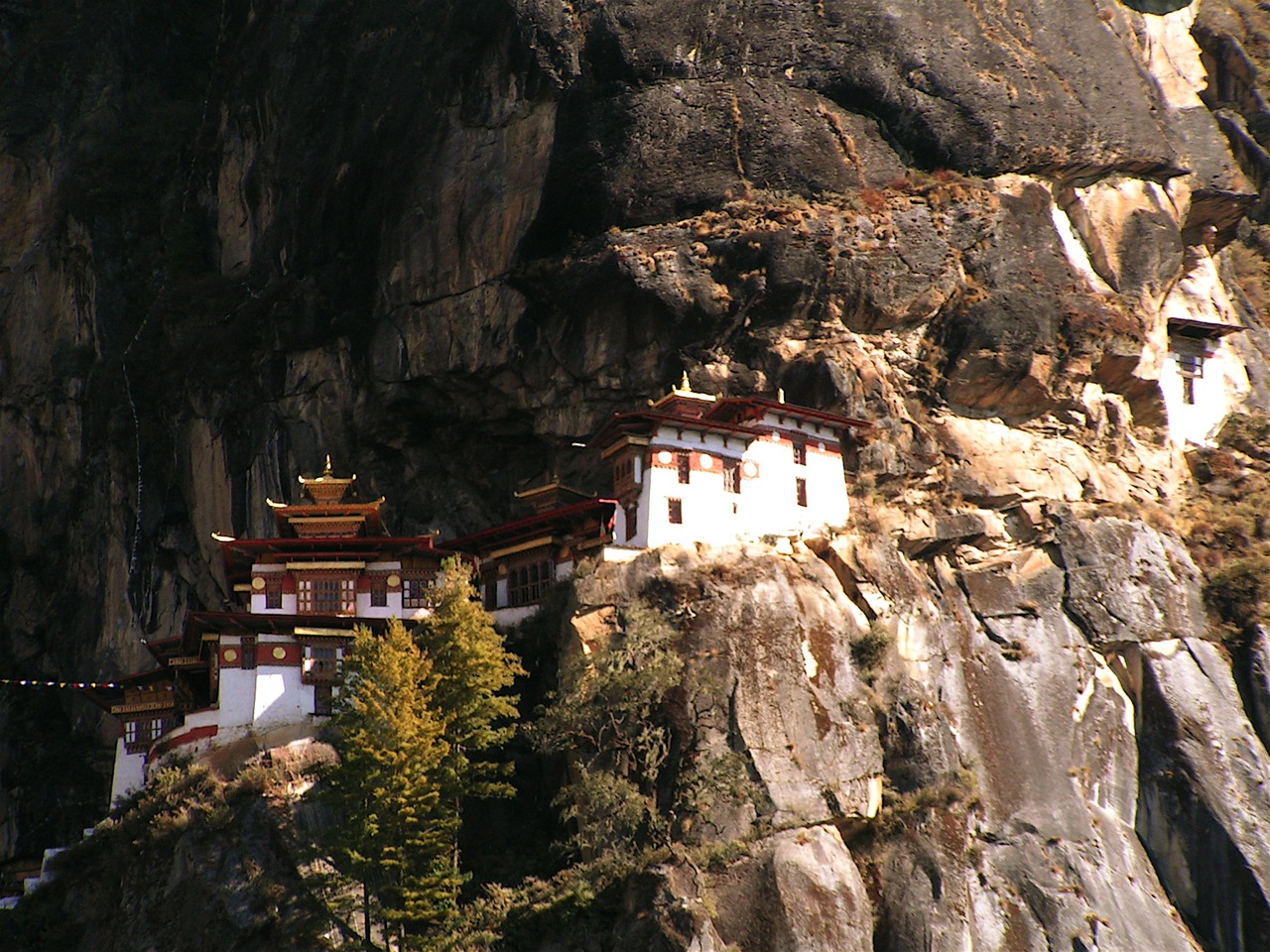
Tiger's Nest temples

The monastery buildings consist of four main temples and residential shelters, ideally designed to adapt to the rock (granite) ledges, caves, and rocky terrain. Out of the eight caves, four are comparatively easy to access. The cave where Padmasambhava first entered, riding the Tiger, is known as 'Tholu Phuk', and the original cave where he resided and meditated is known as the 'Pel Phuk'. He directed the spiritually enlightened monks to build the monastery here. The monastery is so precariously perched that it is said: "it clings to the side of the mountain like a gecko". The main cave is entered through a narrow passage. The dark cave houses a dozen images of Bodhisattvas, and butter lamps flicker in front of these idols. An elegant image of Chenrezig (Avalokitesvara) is also deified here. In an adjoining small cell, the sacred scripture is placed; its importance lies in its having been inscribed with gold dust and the crushed bone powder of a divine Lama. It is also said that the monks who practice Vajrayana Buddhism (the formal state religion of Bhutan) at this cave monastery live here for three years and seldom go down to the Paro valley.

All the buildings are interconnected by stone steps and stairways. There are a few rickety wooden bridges along the paths and stairways to cross over. The temple at the highest level has a Buddha frieze. Each building has a balcony that offers views of the Paro Valley below. The monasteries have an ancient history of occupation by monks, as hermitages.

==== Other structures within the precincts ====
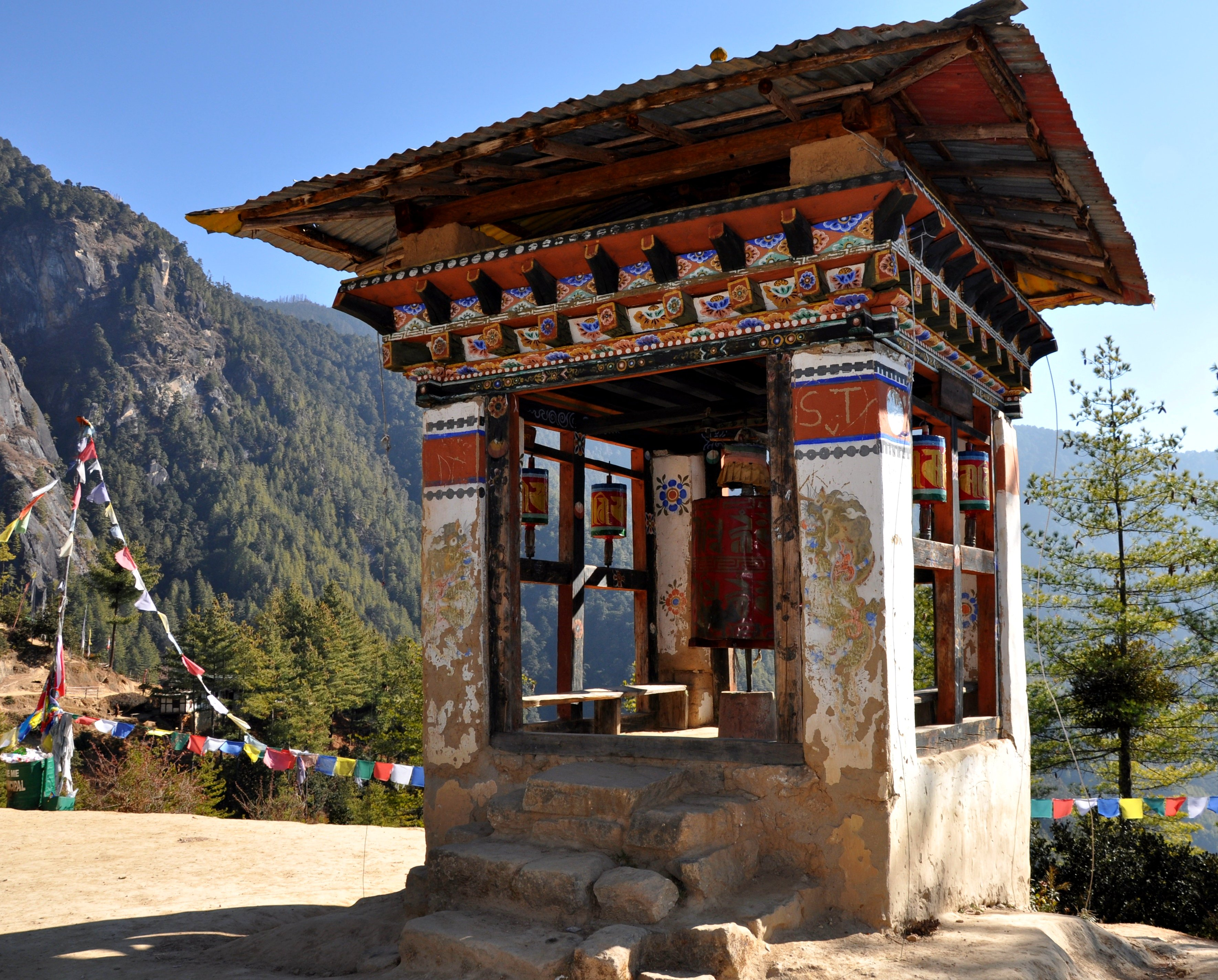
Prayer wheel

Taktsang Zangdo Pari is the place where Padmasambhava's wife, known as the “Fairy of Wisdom”, Yeshe Tshogyal (Ye-shes mtsho-rgyal), the founder of the Mon, a convent, by the same name as Taktsang and also two other convents. The present caretaker of the place is said to be an old nun supported by a young trainee.

Another important place near the shrine is the Urgyan Tsemo, the “Peak of Urgyan” which has a small Mani Lakhang. The prayer wheel, turned by an old monk, resounds with chimes that are heard every day at 4 am. Above the Urgyan is the holy cave temple known as 'Phaphug Lakhang' (dPal-phug IHa-khang), which is the main shrine of the Taktsang. It is also the residence of the Head Lama, Karma Thupden Chokyi Nyenci.

=== Paintings ===
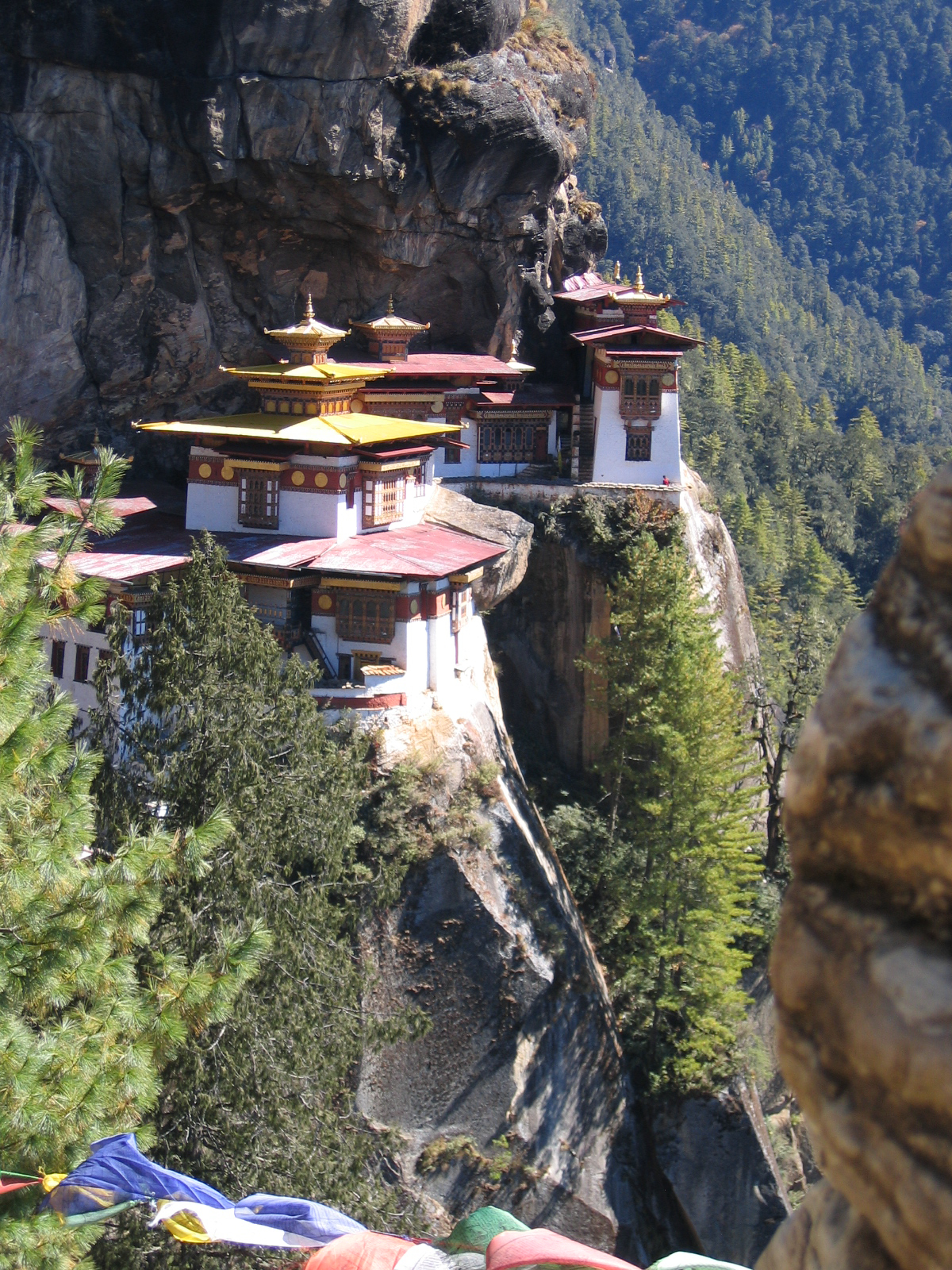
Another view of the monastery

The “Copper-Coloured Mountain Paradise of Padmasambahva” (Zangdopari) is vividly depicted in a heart shape on every thangkha and painted on the monastery walls as a constant reminder of the legend. The paintings are set on a pedestal representing the realm of the King of Nagas amid Dakinis (mKha-hgro-ma), and the pinnacle of the painting denotes the domain of Brahma. The paintings also depict Klu (Naga) demigods with a human head and the body of a serpent, which are said to reside in lakes (which are said to denote that they guard hidden treasures). Allegorically, they are meant to represent the holy spiritual writings. The paintings also show what is termed “Walkers in the Sky” (mKha-hgro-ma).

The holy hill is drawn in the backdrop with four faces painted with different colors – the east face is in crystal white color, the south face is yellow, the west is in red color and the north is green color. The palace has four sides and eight corners with its lower and upper tiers adorned with jewels. The courtyard with four enclosures is said to represent four kinds of conduct. The walls are built with bricks, and balconies have been bejewelled with religious symbols. The ambience is shown in the form of wishing trees, fountains of the water of life, rainbows in five colors with cloud formations and light emanating from lotus flowers. The palace is also shown with a throne with eight corners fully and curiously bejewelled. Padmasambhava is shown sitting on a pure stalk of lotus emitting divine energy, appearing “divine, charitable, powerful, or fierce”.

Further detailing is depicted on the four faces and eight corners: five kinds of Buddhas, suppressing the vicious demons (performing four pious deeds), are placed on thrones mounted over the stooping demons. The demons and Khadoms are depicted seated on four-petalled, four-faced thrones “adorned with necromantic attributes,” enjoying a good time; the Khadoms are seen in the palace's four-sided courtyard and on all the side walls.

The scene is further embellished around the Guru Rinpoche (Padmasambhava) image and in the palace, with gods and goddesses in the heavens, gatekeepers at the four gates, and an army of messengers and servants; all trying to crush the demons to dust. The supporting staff shown are said to represent the Himalayan tribes of the pre-Buddhist period.

== Visiting ==
After the revision of the visa policy of Bhutan in 2023, it was decided that an entrance fee of 1,000 Nu will be levied for all adult visitors to Taktsang from March 2023. Under the same revision, there will be special dates on the Bhutanese lunar calendar whereby only Bhutanese will be allowed to visit Taktsang.
