= Tango Monastery =

Buddhist monastery in Thimphu, Bhutan

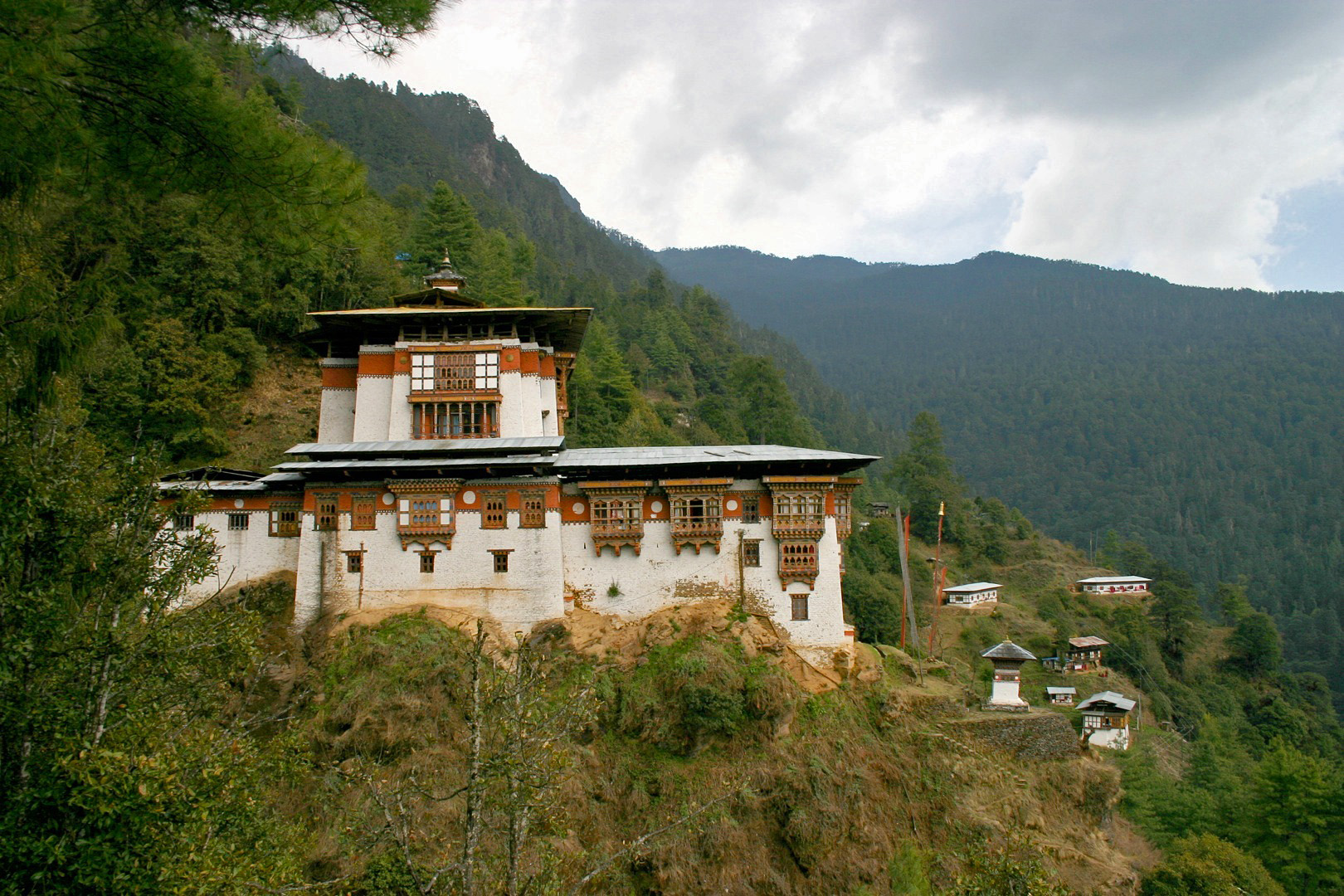
- TangoMonastery

- Location within Bhutan

Religion
- Affiliation: Tibetan Buddhism
- Sect: Drukpa Kagyu School
- Deity: Hayagriva
- Festival: Yarney
- Leadership: 7th Tri Rinpoche

Location
- Location: Thimphu Valley, Thimphu district, Bhutan
- Country: Bhutan
- Interactive map of Tango Monastery
- Coordinates: 27°35′34.99″N 89°38′19.59″E

Architecture
- Style: Dzong
- Founder: 13th century by Gyalse Tenzin Rabgye Lama
- Established: 1688; 338 years ago

The Tango Monastery is a Buddhist monastery located 14 kilometres (8.7 mi) to the north of the capital city of Thimphu in Bhutan, near Cheri Mountain. It was founded by Phajo Drugom Zhigpo (1184? - 1251?) in the 13th century and built in its present form by Tenzin Rabgye, the 4th Temporal Ruler in 1688. In 1616, the Tibetan lama Shabdrung Ngawang Namgyal meditated in its cave. The self-emanated form of the wrathful Hayagriva is deified in the monastery. It belongs to the Drukpa Kagyu School of Buddhism in Bhutan.

== Etymology ==
In the Dzongkha language of Bhutan, the word 'Tango' means “horse head”. This name conforms to the main deity Hayagriva (local name Tandin) deified in the monastery.

== Legend and tribute ==
According to local legend, the location of this monastery is the holy place where Avalokiteshvara revealed himself as "the self-emanated form of the Wrathful Hayagriva". The location had been prophesied in Tibet. The acclamation of the divine nature of this place was performed by Ngawang Tenzin.

... In the spacious southern valley, this horse-head is like a chaitya (chorten) come down from the 33rd heaven. It was emanated like a wish-fulfilling gem from the palaces of the Nagas underneath the earth. It stands on this earth like a tutelary deity. The triangular mandala below the horse-head signifies that it will be a place conducive to meditative accomplishments. The majestic height and space behind the horse-head indicates the greatness and glory of the Kargyupa sect. In front, it has the appearance of a heaping of precious jewels, symbolising the best utilization of endless hidden treasures. The sacred unvarying Vajrasana falls at its right, pointing to the immortality of morally up-right people. At its left is the oblation of the river like the Ganges, possessed of eight attributes, reflecting the satisfaction of all noble sons of the land in the Dharma. At its centre, the unshakeable Vajrasana represents the everlastingness of the Dharmakaya. Below is the dzong of Kiphug nyima, a symbol of the increase of samadhi. Above is the super-natural horse in space, embodying the subjugation of the 3 sensual worlds. The rugged and steep hill to its right signifies the subjugation of heroes. At the left, Maheshvara is shown to be within the power of Hayagriva, signifies the subjugation of heroines. At the centre, the sacred secluded spot of dakini indicates the purity and protection of the Dharma. The Silwatshel (cool grove) temple of Mahakala below symbolizes the subjugation of all the Dharmapalas. The upper part of the sloping valley held by a Lhatsen stands for the offering of siddhi to the yakshas. The lower terrace of the plateau is protected by Mentsuen, auguring good and plentiful harvests, while the wealth of the people on the land is indicative of the abundance of food. In front, the meandering of rivers represents voluntary oblations, and the leafy tree of the forests reflects the increase in experience. The rollicking of monkeys serves as consolation to the yogis. The flutter of wings of birds in the sky offers inspiration to them. Like one rock may have a thousand mouths, so also a religion may have manifold sects, but its reality or the essence is aggregated in the mind. Oh! what a wonderful place it is! The very hearing of its name is enough atonement for one’s sins. The possession of faith will make one blessed. Seeing it, one will be enlightened. Residing in it, one will attain nirvana. There will be contentment and tranquillity. May peace and happiness envelop this place.

== History ==
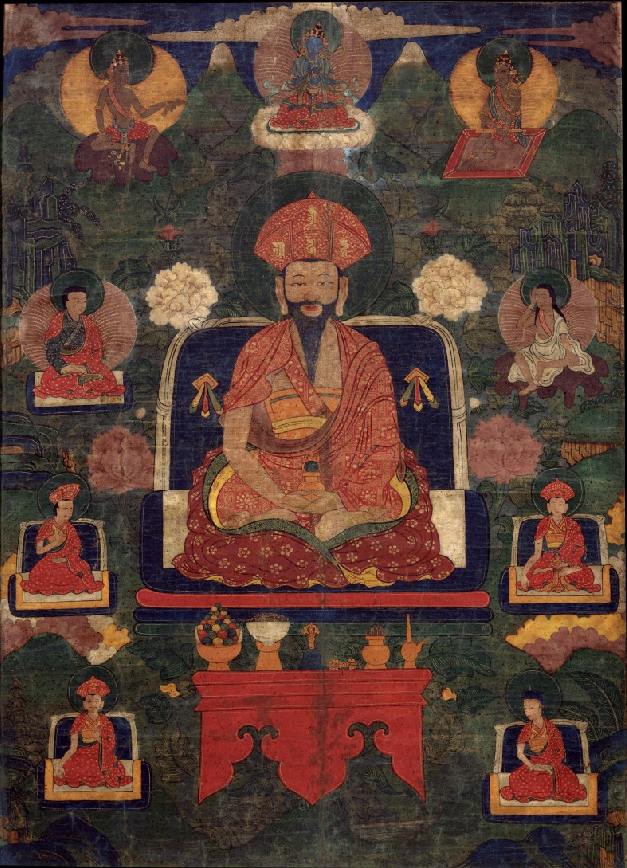
The Shabdrung Ngawang Namgyal, main architect of Bhutan, who meditated for long years in the caves of the Monastery

According to a local legend Phajo Drugom Zhigpo propounder of the teachings of Dodeyna who was on a visit to this place during his teaching mission heard the neighing of a horse coming from the direction of the Tango. Concurrently, he witnessed the cliff in the form of god Tandin (horse head or Hayagriva) engulfed in flames. The deity appearing before Zhigpo prophesied that the place was meant to build a monastery for meditation. The prophecy also mentioned that Zhigpo would marry the Dakini, Khando Sonam Peldon, and establish the Drukpa Kagyu School of Buddhism in Bhutan. The earliest history traced to this location is when Guru Rinpoche on a visit to the place in the 8th century had identified the place as representing the Hayagriva or horse head. It was only in 1222 that the place again got its recognition when Phajo Drugom Zhigpo, propounder of the Drukpa Kagyu School of Buddhism, witnessed the cliff in the form of god Tandin (horse head) or Hayagriva.

Phajo Drugom Zhigpo then founded Tango Choeying Dzong, a meditation hermitage. According to the biography of Phajo Drugom Zhigpo, Tango Choyeing Dzong is one of the four dzongs out of the twelve meditation places entrusted to him by Guru Rinpoche.

Shabdrung Ngawang Namgyal migrated from Tibet to Bhutan in 1616 at the age of 23 not only at the request of Pal Yeshay Genpo but also due to a conflict with Deb Tsangpa of Tibet; Namgyel belonged to a respectable lineage of Tsangpa Jarey in Tibet and had been christened by the name of Drukpa Rinpochhe Ngawang Tenzin Nampar Gyelwa Jigme Drak Pai Dey and had attained name and fame from a young age as an enlightened dharma preacher. When he travelled in Bhutan on a preaching mission he was also attacked by Tibetan army (sent by his enemy Deb Tsangpa). However, by virtue of his skills in the field of tantric art he subdued his enemies, and finally went into meditation in the caves of the Tango Monastery; the monastery had been offered to him by the Tshewang Tenzing of Dorden (now Dodena). He deeply meditated and performed tantric ritual of Gempo in the cave of Tango. With these spiritual powers, Zhabdrung caused the decimation of the dynasty of Deb Tsangpa of Tibet. Consequently, he celebrated this victory by writing of his achievements by composing the “Nga Chudugma or My sixteen Accomplishments”.

Following his victory, Shabdrung Ngawang Namgyal adopted the title of Dujom Dorjee, consolidated his powers and issued sixteen tenets. He renamed the cave monastery as Duduel Phug and then went back to the cave for further meditation. However, the cave was attacked by his enemies using tantric powers. They had destroyed the cliff of the caves, which resulted in blocking of the cave by a huge boulder (size of a yak), which by providence narrowly missed killing the Namgyal, as it is said “the boulder missed Zamdrung’s head by an inch”. His followers considered Zamdrung’s survival as a miracle. During this period Namgyals’ father Tenpai Nima had died and Namgyal brought his father’s body to the cave and cremated it in the cave of the horse head cliff, in Tango. Thereafter, in 1620, Namgyal built the Chari monastery and the Duduel Chorten in memory of his father; the building was constructed by skilled carpenters brought from Nepal.

Gyalse Tenzin Rabgye son of Tshewang Tenzin and Damchoe Tenzima (daughter of the Lama of Chang Gangkha) born in 1638 AD, received religious instructions from a very young age in the Drukpa Kargyud tradition from Shabdrung and his teacher Damchoe Gyeltshe and was very proficient in the tradition when he ascended the throne of Desi at the age of 31. He also became the 4th Desi at the age of 43. As the 4th Temporal Ruler he creditably ruled the country in accordance with set spiritual and temporal laws. The Tango Monastery was rebuilt by him in its present form in 1688/1689. The monastery built with 12 corners has the 3-storey gallery central tower. It was further extended in the 18th and 19th centuries. In the late 19th century, Shabdrung Jigmre Choegyal had a golden roof installed. In 1966 AD, the 64th rJe Khenpo Jamyang Yeshey Sengyel along with Her Royal Highness the Grandmother Ashi Phuntshog Chodon also restarted the Shaydra School of Buddhist Studies. In 1977 AD, Her Majesty the Queen Mother Ashi Kesang Wangchuck refurbished the monastery into a very elegant structure vis-a-vis the original. The monastery underwent restoration again in the mid 1990s and is currently the residence of the 7th Tri Rinpoche, a young incarnation of Tenzin Rabgye. Today it is run as an upper-education level monastic school.

== Architecture ==
Tango Monastery is built in the dzong fashion, and has a characteristic curved (semi-circular) outside wall and prominent main tower with recesses. It covers the caves where originally meditation and miracles were performed by saints from the 12th century onwards. Behind the series of prayer wheels are engraved slates. Inside the courtyard is a gallery, illustrating the leaders of the Drukpa Kagyupa lineage.

Caves

The caves, the original place, before the monastery structure as it exists now was built, is where the holy saints meditated from the 12th century onwards. The rock face identified as the 'Horse head' or 'Hayagriva' is integral to the rock setting of the caves. The caves are formed at two levels – the lower and upper caves with a self formed secret central passage. The central cavern is proclaimed as the “cavern of a dakini containing triangular red and black colours and a natural divine mansion”.

The rock faces at different levels exhibit self-manifest figures of the sun, the moon and of the demon Matramrutra. Other self emanated divine forms identified within the caves consist of: the Pal-khorlo-dompa (Sri Cakrasambhara gods seen even now); a long cavernous passage in the basement that makes a distinction between the good and the evil while manoeuvring through it; the projecting rock face in the form of Hayagriva directly facing the valley denoting Abhicarya in ferocious shapes; a temple of Hayagriva at the lower level; crystal images of tutelary deities; a three-faced Hayagriva (discovered by Ngawang Tenzin); a whip containing combined prayers; a stone slab with foot print of a dakini (the youngest daughter of Ngawang Tenzin); a temple of the four handed Mahakala at the upper cave created by the Shabdrung, a hazardous cave at the bottom – a fit place for hermits; and a large sandalwood tree, considered as walking stick that was planted by Phajo Drukgom with the prophecy that "This will be the centre from which the Drukpa Kargyud doctrine will spread". There is chorten near the cypress trees where Khando Sonam Peldon died. All her belongings are enshrined in the chorten. A Tandin Nye, a temple built by Phajo after his meditation. is also located here.

Monastery/Temple

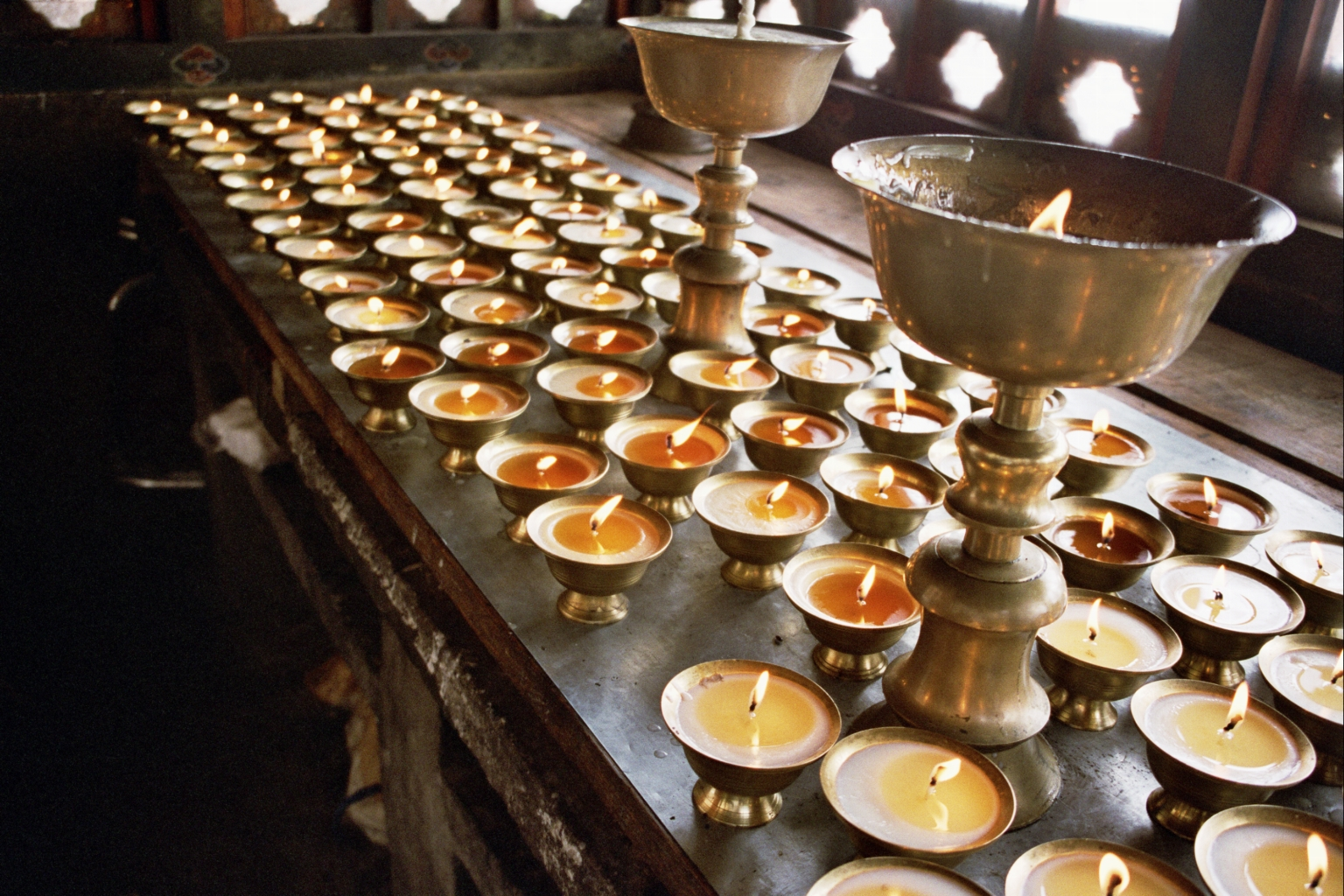
Butter lamps lighted in the temples of the monastery

The 12-cornered monastery was built under the direction of the Gyalse Tenzin Rabgyein in a short span of two months. Basically the monastery has six temples namely, the Trulku lhakhang, the Longku lhakhang, the Choeku lhakhang, the Guru lhakhang, the Namsey Lhakhang and the Gonkhang (inner chapel dedicated to a deity).

On the ground floor in the Tulku lhakhang, is the temple of Trulku where the main deity is of Buddha made in gold and copper. Buddha statue is thrice the height of a man. The sculptor of this statue was the renowned Panchen Deva of Nepal. Flanking the main deity are a clay Buddha Dipankara cast in medicinal metals and a statue of Maitreya (double the height of a man). Life-size statues of the 8 chief spiritual sons of the Buddha (the Jang Sem Nye Wai Say Chen Gyad (Jamyang), Chador, Chenrizig (Avaloketeshvara), Namkhai Nyingpo (Akashagarba), Dripa Namsel, Saye Nyingpo, Jamba and Jampel Zhenu Jurpa) are also located here. These statues are credited to be the work of craftsmen Trulku Dzing and Druk Chophel. Other objects of veneration in the monastery are a stone with a clear footprint of Jetsuen Tenzinma, daughter of Ngawang Tenzin, and also stone impressions of riding horses, goats, and sheep. A golden key discovered by Ngawang Tenzin, in the shape of a horse-head is much revered. Another adjoining temple, the Gonkhang, is dedicated to the four handed Mahakala (Pel Yeshey Gonpo, the protective deity) temple holding a skull in one hand; the skull is said to be that of the Tibetan King Thrisong Detsan."

On the second floor, the statue of Avalokiteshvara – the Buddha of compassion – made (by Panchen Deva of Nepal) of gold and copper is installed in the Longku lhakhang. Also seen on this floor are the temple of Guru Rinpoche and the Namse palace. There is also the Namsey lhakhang where the statue of Namsey (Vaisravana – the god of wealth) is deified.

On the third floor, there are temples of Dharmakaya and a gold and copper statue of Buddha Amitayus (made by Panchen Deva). Buddha image is flanked by a statue of Zhabdrung Ngawang Namgyal and a life-size clay figure, made with medicinal metals, of Gyalse Tenzin Rabgye. The bedroom of Gyalse Tenzin Rabgye is located to the right of the temples. Central to this room is an image of Guru Rinpoche (who appeared in Tenzin Rabgye's vision). Other object seen here includes the Kargyud Serthreng. Other images are made with medicinal metals and all images here are credited to Trulku Dzing, the sculptor. A set of paintings seen on the walls here are weeping images. The depiction of weeping is an expression of sorrow at the demise of Gyalse Tenzin Rabgye, at the age of 59 years. There is also self-made image of Trulku Jampel Yamtsho. Wall paintings are seen on all the three floors of the monastery.

There is a natural fountain in the middle of the courtyard opposite to the central tower. A chaitya known as Jangchub Chorten or Kudung Chorten, built with the ashes of Gyalse Tenzin Rabgye is located between the Dzong and the monastery.

== Festival ==
The Yarney ('Yar' means “Summer” and 'Ney' means “To stay”) represents monks' summer retreat time and is an important annual festival that is held in this monastery. Initiated since 1967, the festival starts from the 15th day of the 6th month of the Bhutanese calendar and concludes on the 30th day of the 7th month, which corresponds to the month of August/September in the Gregorian calendar. During this period, which lasts for one-and-a-half-months, the monks observe special vows and the strictest monastic disciplines. The observances by the monks are in the form of their wearing ceremonial yellow robes, do elaborate chants of prayers before and after eating (eating meals from begging bowls), desist taking the afternoon meal, do not leave the precincts of the monastery, and not involve in any kind of entertainment on holidays; such observances are deemed to accumulate great merits. During this period, common people make food offerings to the monks.
