= Centre for Bhutan Studies and GNH Research =

Research institute in Bhutan

The Centre for Bhutan Studies and GNH Research (formerly The Centre for Bhutan Studies) is a research institute located in Thimphu, Bhutan, established in 1999 with the purpose of promoting research and scholarship in Bhutan.

The president of the centre is Dasho Karma Ura.

== Publications ==
=== Periodical ===
Since 1999 the centre has regularly published an English language academic journal Journal of Bhutan Studies. PDF copies of articles published in this journal are freely available online. Articles cover not only the history of Bhutan but also issues to do with Gross National Happiness.

=== Books ===
- Choden, Tashi; Desel, Pema; Dorji, Lham; Kinga, Sonam; Penjore, Dorji (2003), Secret Ballots in Rural Heartland: Gup Elections, 2002, Thimphu: Centre for Bhutan Studies, ISBN 99936-14-09-7
- Phuntsho, Jigme (2017), Fruits of Happiness: How Horticulture Enhances GNH in Mongar, Bhutan, Thimphu: Centre for Bhutan Studies, ISBN 978-99936-14-87-6
- Ura, Karma; Alike, Sabina; Zangmo, Tshoki; Wangdi, Karma (2012), A Short Guide to Gross National Happiness Index, Thimphu: Centre for Bhutan Studies, ISBN 978-99936-14-66-1

== See also ==
- Gross national happiness
- The Kingdom at the Centre of the World
