= Phajo Drugom Zhigpo =

Influential practitioner of Tibetan Buddhism

Phajo Drugom Shigpo (Tibetan: ཕ་ཇོ་འབྲུག་སྒོམ་ཞིག་པོ, Wylie: pha jo 'brug sgom zhig po) [1184−1251 / 1208−1275] was a Tibetan Buddhist particularly important in the early spread of the Drukpa school to Bhutan where he is revered as an emanation of Avalokiteśvara. His descendants played a significant role in the history of Bhutan. The Sacred Sites associated with Phajo Drugom Zhigpo and his descendants is listed as a tentative site in Bhutan's Tentative List for UNESCO inclusion.

== Biography ==
=== Early life ===
Just before he died, the founder of the Drukpa school, Tsangpa Gyare Yeshe Dorje told his nephew and heir, Onre Darma Senge (1177–1237), "A Khampa son from Kham is coming. But he won't meet me. You look after him. Send him to the southern valley that has been visited and blessed by Orgyen Padma Jungne. He will be of great service to the Buddha Dharma."

Phajo Drugom Zhigpo was born, probably in 1184, at Yangtse Babchu (yang tse 'bab chu), Tashigang in the Do-Kham region of East Tibet the youngest of three sons of the merchant Dabzang (da-bzang), who belonged to a branch of the Gya (rgya) clan, and his wife Achi Palmo Kyid (a chi pel nor kid). His was originally named Dondrub Gyaltsen. Phajo's Tibetan hagiography and Drukpa Kagyu religious histories from Bhutan relate various auspicious and miraculous signs accompanying his conception, gestation, and birth, and record that he was an obstinate and precocious child.

At the age of seven he began his studies under a local Nyingma priest who taught him reading and writing. At the age of 12, he went to study with a Nyingma master named Tharpalingpa who gave him the complete set of lay devotees vows and the name Tarpa Gyaltsen. From this teacher he received and received instructions on generating the great thought of enlightenment, teachings on the Maha, Anu and Ati levels of Tantra, Dzogchen and in particular empowerment and teachings on "all the Cycles of Mahākaruṇika"(The Great Compassionate One a name of Avalokiteśvara). He also received all the cycles and empowerments of the Eight Commandments (bka brgyad).

From a lama he also received instructions on the texts Mahamudra Dispelling the Darkness of Ignorance and a Chöd text called The Profound Teaching of Object Cutting During a Single Sitting.

Then he did prolonged meditation at Lingkar Drak, a place blessed by Guru Padmasambhava.

=== Meeting with Sangey Onre Darma Senge ===
One day he learned of the spiritual reputation of Tsangpa Gyare from some traders of Jang Taklung. Merely hearing the name of Tsangpa Gyare generated a deep sense of devotion in him and tears came to his eyes. Moved with great devotion, he made up his mind to go to Ralung to see Tsangpa Gyare. He sought his teacher's permission to go on a pilgrimage to Lhasa and Samye. After receiving the remaining instructions from his teacher, he set off on his journey. It took him almost a year to reach the U-Tsang region of Tibet.

While in Samye, he heard the news of Tsangpa Gyare's passing away from two ascetics and he fainted. When he regained his senses, he heard about Onre Darma Sengye, the Regent of Tsangpa Gyare at Ralung, whose spiritual attainment was equal to that of Tsangpa Gyare. At the age of 33, Tharpa Gyaltsen arrived at Ralung. As instructed by Tsangpa Gyare, Onre Darma Sengye took him as his disciple and transmitted the teachings of the Drukpa Kagyu tradition. After receiving the teachings for about a year, Tharpa Gyaltsen meditated at Jekar and Longdol and "strenuously practiced meditation for three years and fully actualized the realization. In particular, he perfected his mastery of Mahamudra." He then went back to his master Onre Darma Sengye and related his experiences and, impressed by his realization, Onre gave him the name Phajo Druggom Zhigpo and bestowed on him the complete empowerments and teachings of Rechungpa's Ear Whispered Transmission of Samvara (bde mchog snyan rgyud).

At the appropriate time, Onre Darma Senye told Phajo about Tsangpa Gyare's prophecy and gave him instructions about his activities in Bhutan. In 1224, at the age of 40, Phajo left for Bhutan to carry out the prophecy of Tsangpa Gyare.

=== Activities in Bhutan ===
At the time of Phajo's arrival at Lingzhi, in Bhutan, a cow belonging to a local rich man named Matong Gyi, had given birth to a calf with the head of a donkey and a snake as the tail. He approached Phajo for help. Phajo subjugated the evil spirit and it became a normal calf. All the nomads of Lingzhi joined together and offered Jagoe Dzong and all the surrounding land to Phajo.

Then Phajo meditated at Paro Taktsang for a month. In a vision during the meditation, Guru Padmasambhava instructed him to travel throughout the country and meditate at twelve places:

- Four Dzongs (fortresses) - Taktsang Sengye Samdrub Dzong, Tago Choying Dzong, Lingzhi Jagoe Dzong and Yangtse Thubo (Thuwo) Dzong;
- Four Draks (rocks) - Gom Drak, Thukje Drak, Tsechu Drak and Dechen Drak
- Four Phugs (caves) - Tsedong Phug, Gawa Phug, Langthang Phug and Sengye Phug.

While staying at Darkar Latse, Phajo met Achog and took her as his consort. A son was born and given the name Dampa. When Phajo went to Wang Sinmo, he met Sonam Paldron, a girl with the signs of a Dakini, at Chagzam Bridge. Since meeting her had been prophesied to Phajo in a vision, he took her also as his consort. The bridge came to be known as Lungten Zampa, or the ‘Bridge of the Prophecy’. Phajo gave her all the instructions and empowerments of the Drukpa tradition. Then they went to meditate at the cave Dodena, where Tango Monastery stands today. In a vision during the meditation, Hayagriva instructed Phajo to continue his line through children to spread the traditions of the Drukpa lineage. After nine months Sonam Paldron gave birth to a daughter.

Leaving his consort and daughter at Dodena, Phajo went to meditate at all the places prophesied. One day, while he was at the Dechen Drak, the string of his rosary broke and the beads scattered in all directions. This was an omen that his teachings would spread all over the country in the future.

Prior to the arrival of Phajo Druggom, the followers of Nyoe Gyalwa Lhanangpa, a disciple of Kyobpa Jigten Sumgon (1143–1217), the founder of the Drikung Kagyud, known as Lhapa had great influence and controlled a large part of western Bhutan. However, the Phajo over came the dominance over Lhapa in the later periods.

Sonam Paldron gave birth to seven sons. One day, Phajo took all seven sons to a bridge and, invoking the deities to decide which of his sons were demons and which would preserve his lineage, he threw all of them into the river. Three sons drowned and four remained unharmed. This story spread across the country and Lhakpas, the later holders of Lhanangpa's line of teaching (i.e. Dregung Kaguye) was said to have become envious and hostile as the parties sought dominance of the area. It was said that Lhapas sent a letter to Phajo saying, "You cannot spread your teaching without a mutual consent since I have started the teaching in this country for the first time. You should either look after the monastery of Jathel Dzong or serve as in a mutual way. Else we will have dispute".

Phajo dismissed the threat and wrote back saying that he had been sent by Onre Darma Sengye in accordance with the prophecy of Tsangpa Gyare, to spread the teachings of the Drukpa lineage. Then the dispute erupted between the lhapas and Phajo, exchanging forces and power, where the Phajos effort made it to succession by over coming the Lhapas to spread the drukpa kagyued. When this news was conveyed to Noge Gelwa Lhanangpa, he said to his followers that, the drukpa spread was predestined for the small kingdom, while the rulers of the kingdom will remain from his lineage.

Phajo began to spread the teachings of the Drukpa lineage systematically. He firmly established the Drukpa lineage teachings as the main school in western Bhutan and exerted considerable political and spiritual influence in the rest of the country. He passed on the teachings to his sons and sent them to different areas. They ruled according to the principles of the Dharma. In 1251, at the age of 68, Phajo died at Tago.

== Sources ==
- Dargye, Yonten and Sørensen, P.K. (2001); The Biography of Pha 'Brug-sgom Zhig-po called The Current of Compassion. Thumphu: National Library of Bhutan. ISBN 99936-17-00-8
- Dargye, Yonten. (2001) History of the Drukpa Kagyud School in Bhutan (12th to 17th Century A.D.) ISBN 99936-616-0-0
- Ardusi, John A. (2000). The House of 'Ob-mtsho — History of a Buddhist Gentry Family during the 13th to 20th Century. in Journal of Bhutan Studies Vol 2:1 p. 1-29. Thimphu: Centre for Bhutan Studies.
