= Jigme Chhoeda =

70th Je Khenpo of Bhutan

His Holiness Tulku Jigme Chhoeda
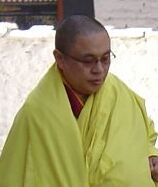
- Je Khenpo in 2010, wearing saffron.
- In office Je Khenpo
- Incumbent
- Assumed office 1996 – present
- Preceded by: Geshey Genduen Rinchen
- In office Dorji Lopen
- In office 1995–1996
- Title: 70th Je Khenpo

Personal life
- Born: 22 August 1955 (age 70) Autsho, Lhuntse
- Parents: 1. Yab Rinzin Dorji (father); 2. Yum Kuenzang Choden (mother)

Religious life
- Religion: Tibetan Buddhism

Tulku Jigme Chhoeda (born 5 August 1955) is the 70th and current Je Khenpo (Chief Abbot of The Central Monastic Body) of Bhutan. He became the chief abbot in 1996, and is the longest-serving holder of the office.

== Early life and education ==
Jigme Chhoeda (རྗེ་མཁན་པོ།) was born to Yab (ཡབ།) Rinzin Dorji and Yum (ཡུམ།) Kuenzang Choden in Lhuentse at Drubtse Goenpa, Kurtoe, on the fifth day of the Bhutanese lunar month seven in the Wood Sheep year of 1955.

On 22 August 1955, Jigme Chhoeda was recognized as the reincarnation of Geshey Pema Tshering, the learned sage of Tharpaling in Bumthang.

Jigme Chhoeda joined Druk Sanga Chhoeling Monastery in Darjeeling, India, at the age of eight. He was ordained as a monk with commitment from Drukpa Thuksey Rinpoche and then studied under Khenpo Sonam Darge and Khenpo Noryang. Later, he studied under Dudjom Rinpoche in India.

At the age of 15, he returned to Bhutan and studied at the Tango Drupdey in Thimphu under the 68th Je-Khenpo Ngawang Tenzin Dhondup. He received the complete initiations and teachings of the Drukpa Kagyu tradition and Dzogchen (the highest realization). He mastered the Mahamudra practices, the meditation of Naro Choedrug (the six circles of Ro-Nyom Kordrug). Tulku also studied language and literature and the 13 different philosophical texts under the 69th Je-Khenpo Geshey Genduen Rinchen.

== Meditation and retreat ==
Jigme Chhoeda completed Losum Choesum three times, a meditation retreat of 3 years, 3 months, and 3 days. During the ten-year retreat, he took up sacred practice of Vajrayana, which includes La-drup, Demchog, Tandin, Dorji Phagmo, Sengdongma, Mithrugpa, Chenrezig and Dzogchen meditations.

== Major positions held ==
Tulku was appointed as the head of Tango Monastery and taught language and Buddhist philosophy. In 1986, he was appointed as the Drapoi Lopen of the Central Monastic Body, and resigned in 1990. In 1995 Fourth Dragon King Jigme Singye Wangchuck appointed him as the Dorji Lopen. On the tenth day of the Bhutanese lunar month three, 1996, His Holiness was enthroned as the 70th Je khenpo of Bhutan.

== Honours ==
- Bhutan :
  - The Royal Saffron Scarf (19 March 1996).
  - Order of the Dragon King, First Class (18 December 2018).
