= Tenzin Doendrup =

68th Je Khenpo of Bhutan

His Holiness Je Thrizur Tenzin Doendrup
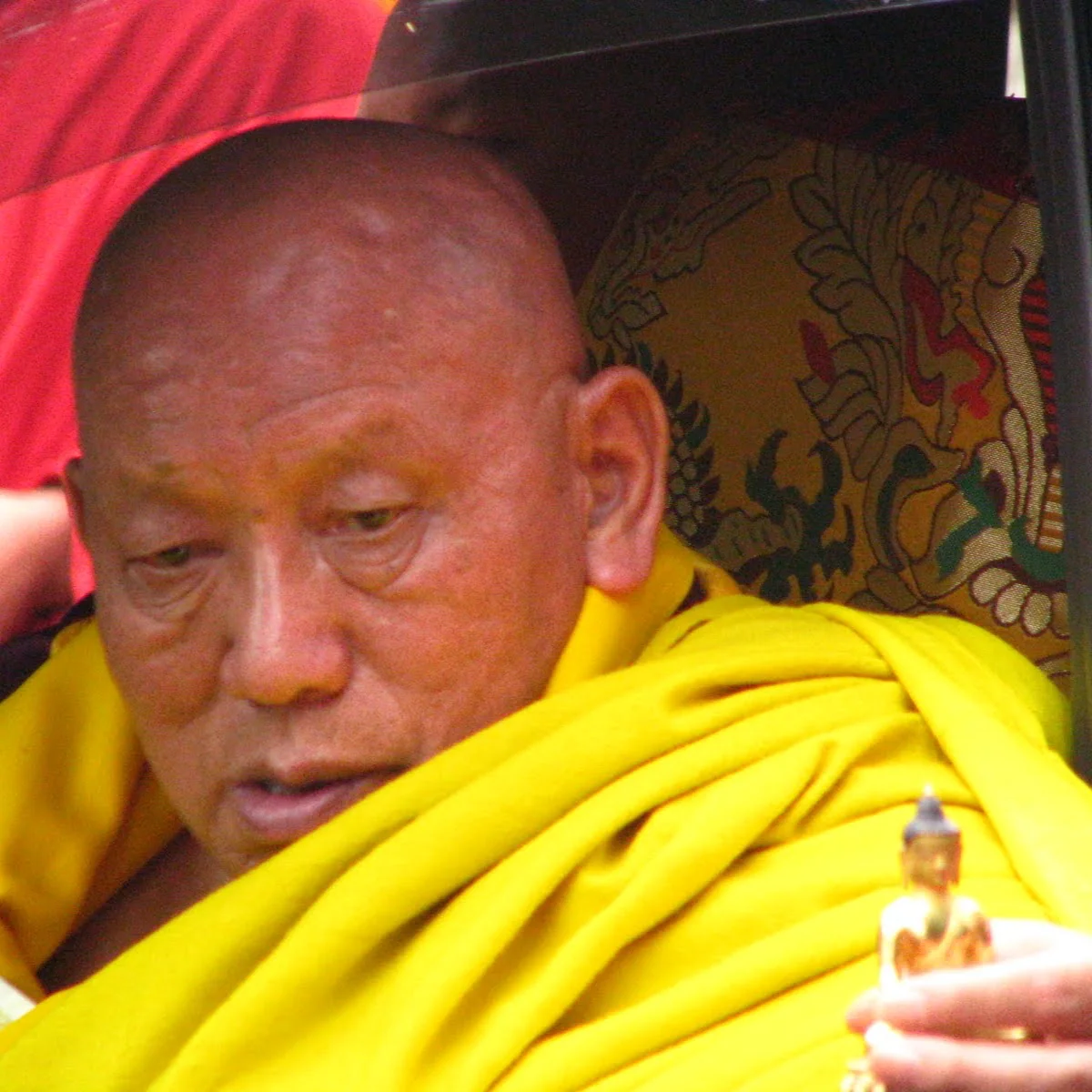
- Je Thrizur in 2010

68th Je Khenpo
- In office 1986–1990
- Preceded by: Nyizer Thinley Lhendrup
- Succeeded by: Gendün Rinchen

Personal life
- Born: 1925 Shar Fadingkha, Wangdue Phodrang, Bhutan
- Died: 8 April 2020 (aged 95) Dodena, Thimphu, Bhutan
- Honours: Order of the Druk Gyalpo, The Royal Saffron Scarf

Religious life
- Religion: Bhutanese Buddhism, Vajrayana Buddhism
- Movement: Rimé movement

Tenzin Doendrup (referred to as His Holiness Je Thrizur) (1925 – 8 April 2020) was the 68th Je Khenpo of Bhutan who served as the chief abbot of the Zhung Dratshang, the central monastic body of Bhutan, from 1986 to 1990. He belonged to the Drukpa Lineage of Tibetan and Bhutanese Buddhism. Je Thrizur received Bhutan's highest honor, Ngadag Pelgi Khorlo or the Order of the Druk Gyalpo, in 2008 for his contributions to Buddhism and to the country's monastic body.

== Early life ==
Doendrup was born in Shar Fadingkha in the Wangdue Phodrang region of Bhutan in 1925 to father Ugyen and mother Tsheltrium. He started his Buddhist studies at the age of seven at the Punakha Dratshang. After completing his early studies, he studied at the Tharpaling Monastery in the Bumthang District of Bhutan. Some of his teachers during this time included Shudab Tempa Rinchen, Choeda Lam, and Ngawang Thinley.

He later went to Tibet where he studied within the Drupka Kagyu traditions at the Minduling Dratshang. In addition to religion he studied calligraphy. His teachers during this period included Lam Kathokpa.

== Religious life ==
Je Thrizur returned to Bhutan at the age of 27 to further his religious pursuits. He was appointed the head of the Tango Monastery in 1966 by the 64th Je Khenpo Yeshey Singye. In 1967 he was appointed the first Lopon of the new Drubdey at the Tango monastery and later in 1985, he became the Dorje lopon of the central monastic body.

He was conferred the title of the 68th Je Khenpo on 12 April 1986 at the age of 62. Je Thrizur held this title through 1990 when he retired. As the Je Khenpo, he was the chief abbot of the Zhung Dratshang, the central monastic body of Bhutan, from 1986 to 1990. As the Je Khenpo he was also the chairman of the Bhutanese Council for Religious Affairs. Je Thrizur brought about many reforms to the Zhung Dratshang and also instituted the first Buddhist Shedra (transl. higher learning center) at Tango and Cheri in Thimphu. During his tenure he issued a decree asking for the stopping of the practice of animal sacrifice as a part of annual rituals. After his retirement, he remained the patron of the Tango and Cheri Buddhist Shedras, and settled at the Chari Monastery.

Je Thrizur was awarded Ngadag Pelgi Khorlo or the Order of the Druk Gyalpo, Bhutan's highest honor, for his contributions to the Buddhist religion and to the central monastic body by the Bhutanese king Jigme Khesar Namgyel Wangchuck in 2008. He belonged to the Drukpa Lineage of Tibetan and Bhutanese Buddhism. His teachings were followed by devotees in Tibet, Bhutan, and India.

== Honours ==
Bhutan:

- Order of the Druk Gyalpo (2008)
- The Royal Saffron Scarf (Note: Aside from the King of Bhutan, only the Je Khenpo may don a saffron kabney.) (1986)

== Death ==
Je Thrizur died on 8 April 2020 at the age of 95 at his home in Dodena, Thimphu. He had earlier returned to the Chagri Monastery from his winter residence in Rinchending, Phuntsholing. He was given a state funeral with the Phurjang (transl. cremation) ceremony being conducted on 7 November 2020 at Punakha Dzong.
