= Gendün Rinchen =

69th Je Khenpo of Bhutan

His Holiness Geshey Gendün Rinchen
- In office Je Khenpo
- In office 1990–1996
- Preceded by: Tenzin Dundrup
- Succeeded by: Jigme Choedra
- Title: 69th Je Khenpo

Personal life
- Born: 1926 Paro Taktsang, Bhutan
- Died: 18 April 1997 (aged 70−71) Yangchenphug, Thimphu, Bhutan
- Parents: Kinzang Dorji (father); Tashi Chokey (mother)

Religious life
- Religion: Tibetan Buddhism

Geshey Gendün Rinchen (Tibetan: དགེ་འདུན་རིན་ཆེན་, Wylie: dge vdun rin chen, 1926–1997) was the 69th Je Khenpo of Bhutan.

== Biography ==
Gendün Rinchen was born in a small cave by the side of the path to Paro Tagtsang, so as a child he was nicknamed "Dragphugpa" (Cave Man).

He was the eldest son born to Kinzang Dorji and Tashi Chokey. He has two other brothers namely Ugyen Tshering (full-brother) and Phup Dorji (half-brother, born to Tashi Chokey and Tazi, her second husband, after the death of Kinzang Dorji).

At a young age he showed great interest in the Buddhist religion and at seven he received novice ordination at Tashichö Dzong in Thimphu and was given the name Gendün Rinchen.

When he was twenty-seven he travelled to Lhodrak Lhalung, center of the tradition of Padma Lingpa in Southern Tibet. There he studied the Thirteen great texts of Mahayana Buddhist Philosophy from Khatok Khen Rinpoche. At the age of twenty-nine he went to Drigung in Central Tibet where he studied classical Tibetan orthography, grammar and poetry; the works of Mipham Rinpoche and Khenpo Shenga and received many tantric teachings including those on the Mañjuśrīnāmasamgīti. Afterwards he went to Samye Monastery where he received the empowerments and instructions of the Rinchen Terdzö; the Nyingthig and Longchenpa's Dzödun from Dudjom Jigdral Yeshe Dorje.

After returning to Bhutan, he entered a three-year meditation retreat at the Tagsang Palphug hermitage, which was followed by another three year retreat he entered when he was forty at Kungachöling in Paro. From Lopon Sonam Zangpo, a disciple of Drubwang Shakya Shri, he received teachings on the Six Yogas of Naropa, Mahāmudrā, and so on.

For ten years he was the abbot of Tango Monastery where he wrote many commentaries on Buddhist philosophy, sutra and tantra.

In 1990 he was enthroned as the 69th Je Khenpo of Bhutan and subsequently travelled throughout the country giving religious teachings. At the age of 61 he resigned from the post of Je Khenpo and retired to a life of prayer and meditation at Jangchub Ding in Yangchenphug.

== Death ==
In 1997, on the ninth day of the third month according to the Bhutanese calendar, he died sitting in a straight meditation posture. It is reported that his body remained sitting thus for more than a week or eleven days during which time his body remained flexible and showed no signs of decay.

His physical remains are now preserved in a gold and silver reliquary stupa in the Shabdrung Chapel of Tashichö Dzong, Thimphu.

== Works ==
The Collected Works of Gendün Rinchen published in 6 volumes, include:

- lho 'brug chos 'byung - A detailed account of the religious history of Bhutan
- dpal 'brug pa rin po che mthu chen chos kyi rgyal po ngag dbang rnam rgyal gyi rnam thar rgya mtso'i snying po - A biography of Zhabdrung Ngawang Namgyal (1594-1651)
- kyai rdor rgyud kyi tshig don rnam bshad - a commentary on the Hevajra Tantra based on the exegesis of the Ngok tradition.
- 'brug pa kun legs kyi rnam thar rgya mtsho'i snying po mthong ba don ldan - A hagiography of the holy madman Drukpa Kunley (1455-1529). This has been translated into English by Keith Dowman and published as The Divine Madman: The Sublime Life and Songs of Drukpa Kunley. ISBN 978-0913922750

== Honours ==
- Bhutan :
  - The Royal Saffron Scarf (1990).

== Sources ==
- Drukpa, Publications (2009). "His Holiness the 69th Je Khenpo Gendun Rinchen". The Dragon Yogis: A Collection of Selected Biographies and Teachings of the Drukpa Lineage Masters. H.H. The Gyalwang Drukpa (Fwd.), H.H. the Je Khenpo Trulku Jigme Chhoeda (Fwd.), John A. Ardussi (Intro). Gurgaon: Drukpa Publications Pvt. Ltd. pp. 76–79. ISBN 978-8190589130. LCCN 2009311812.
