= Serlung Monastery =

Monastery in Bhutan

Coordinates: 27.2440°N 89.5196°E

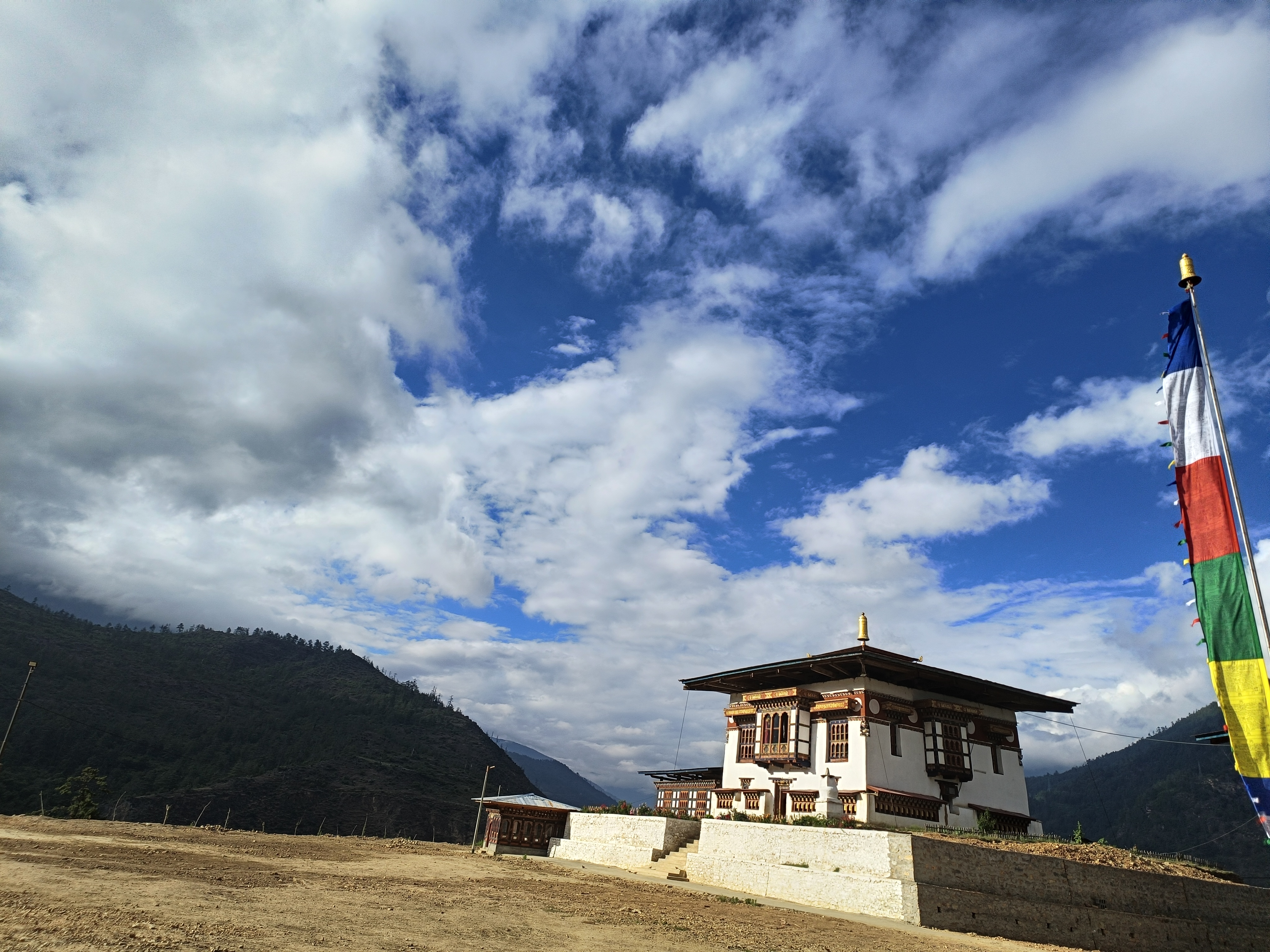
Old Lhakhang of the Serlung Goenzin Monastery

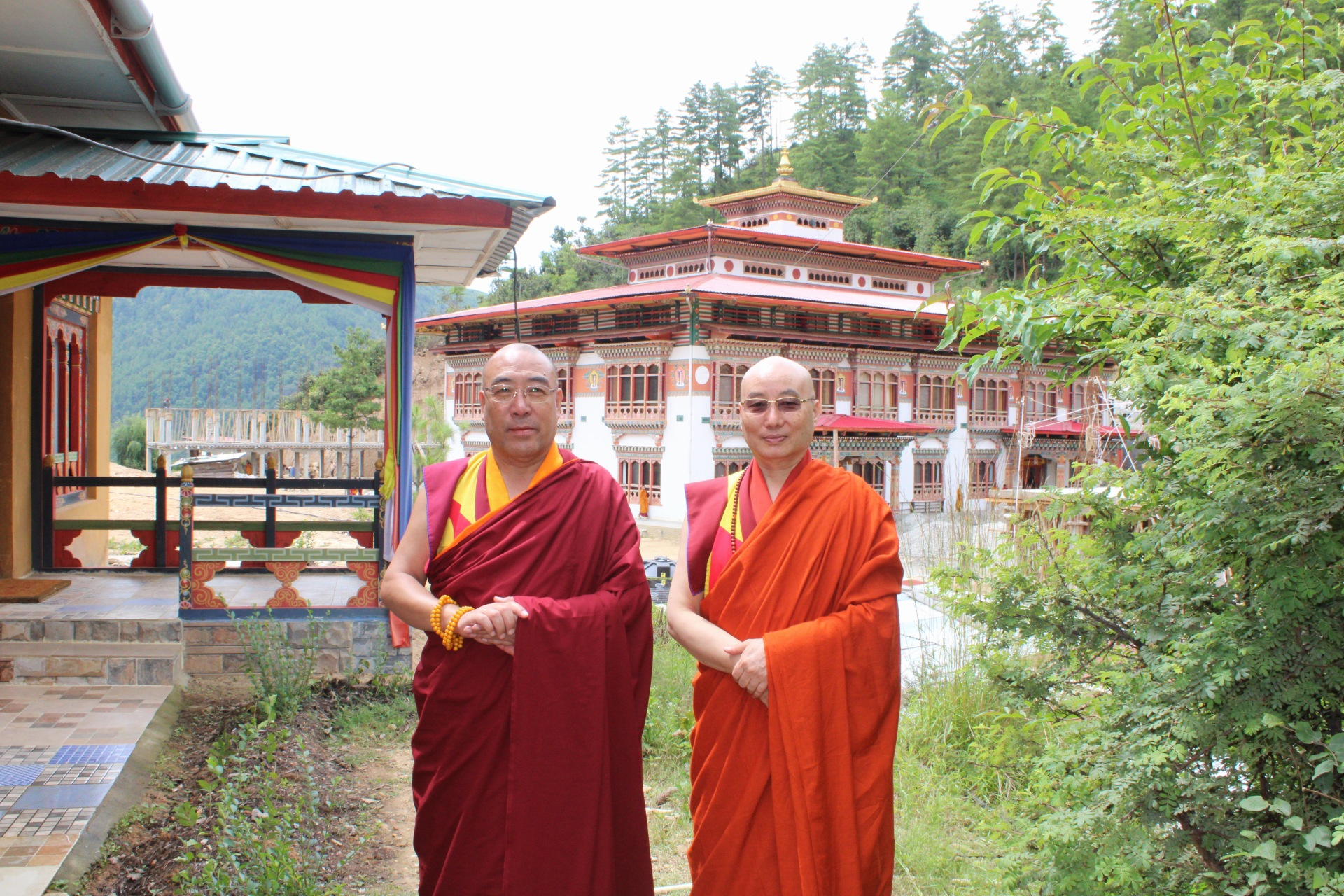
Tshogki Lopen Khenchen Sangay Khandu and Khenchen Karma Lodey.

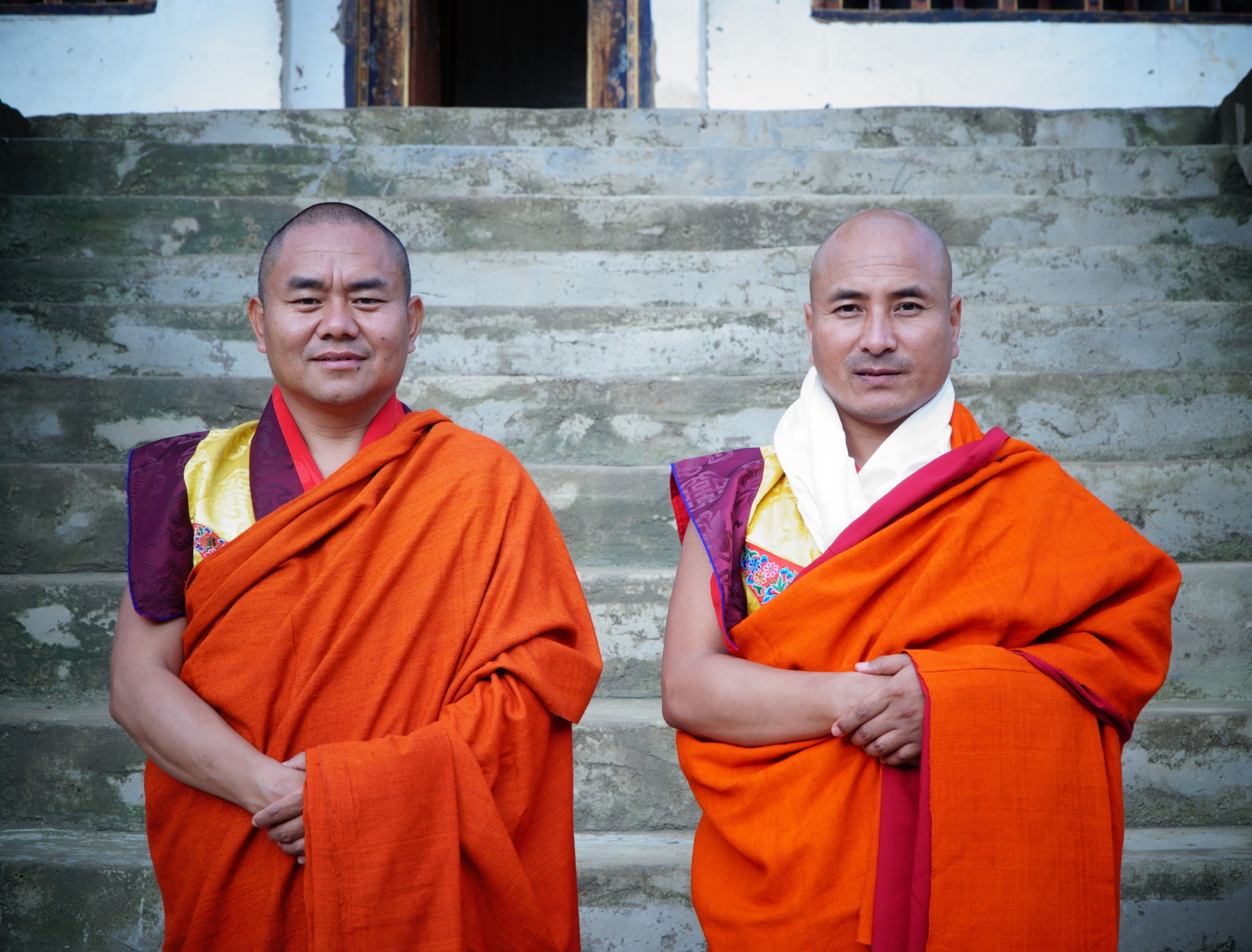
The two principals of Serlung Buddhist Institute, who changed the institute to Goenzin. (དབུ་འཛིན་རིམ་བྱོན་གཉིས།) (Khenpo Kuenzang Tobgay Namgyel and Khenpo Tashi Dorji)

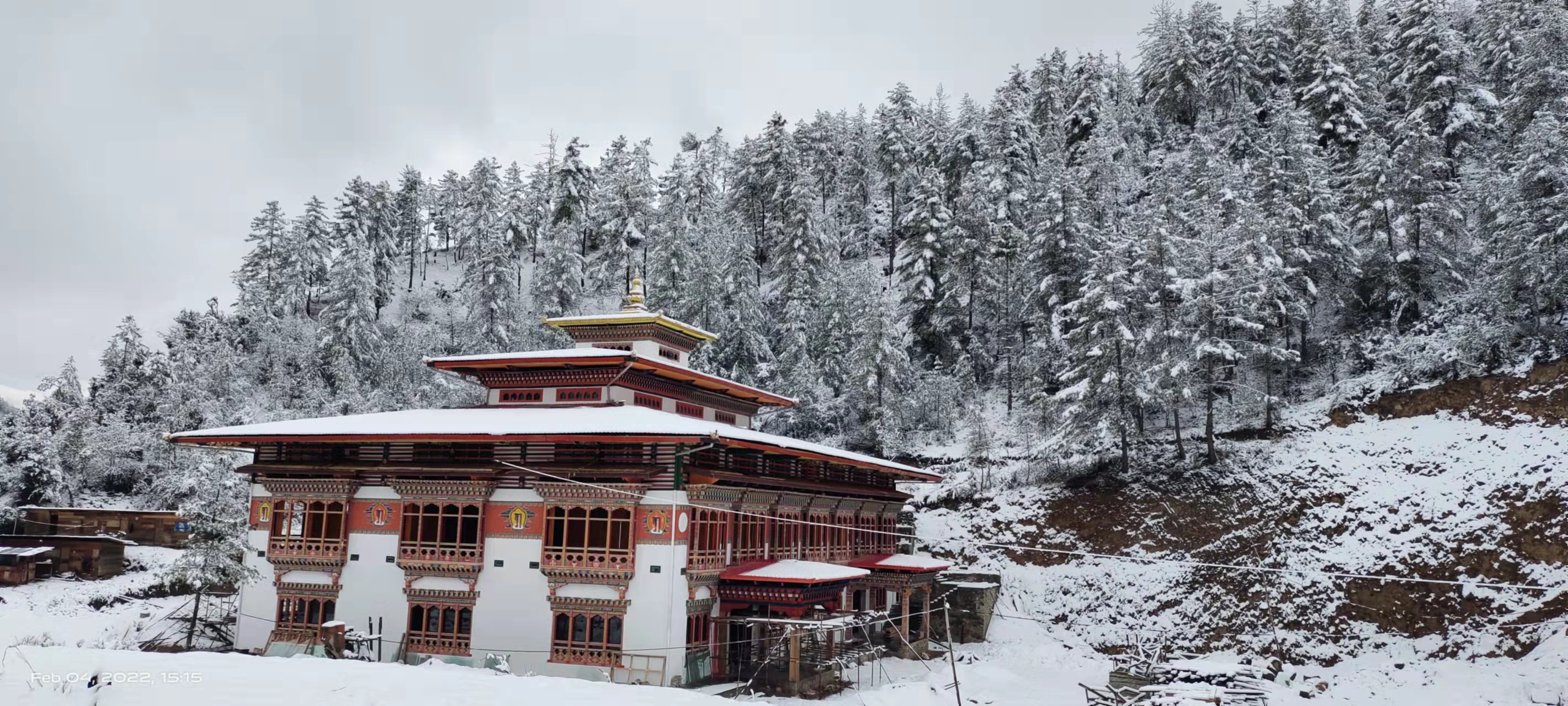
Winter view of new Tshokhang, 4 February 2022.

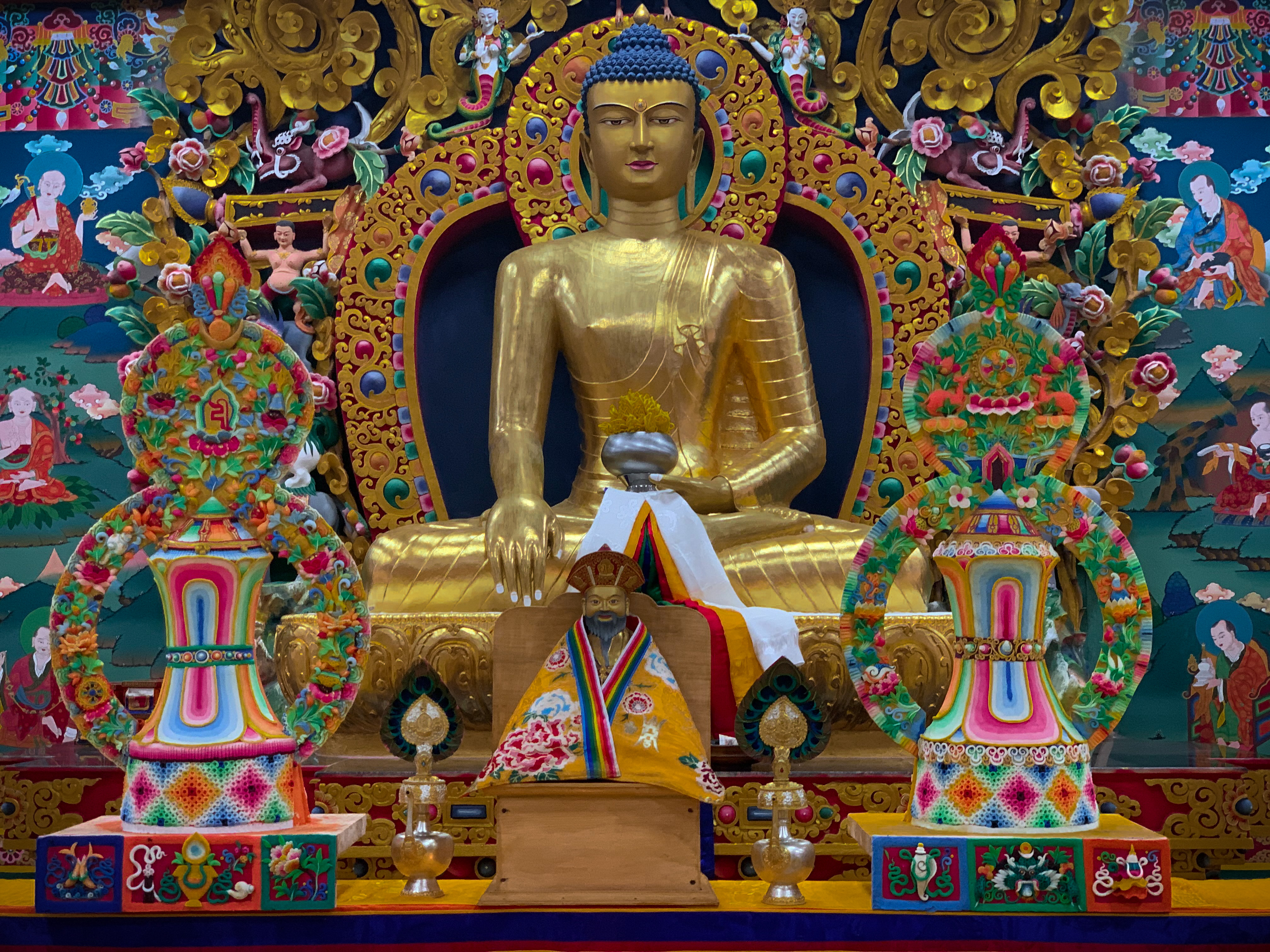
Statue of Buddha is the main inner monument in the new Tshokhang on ground floor.

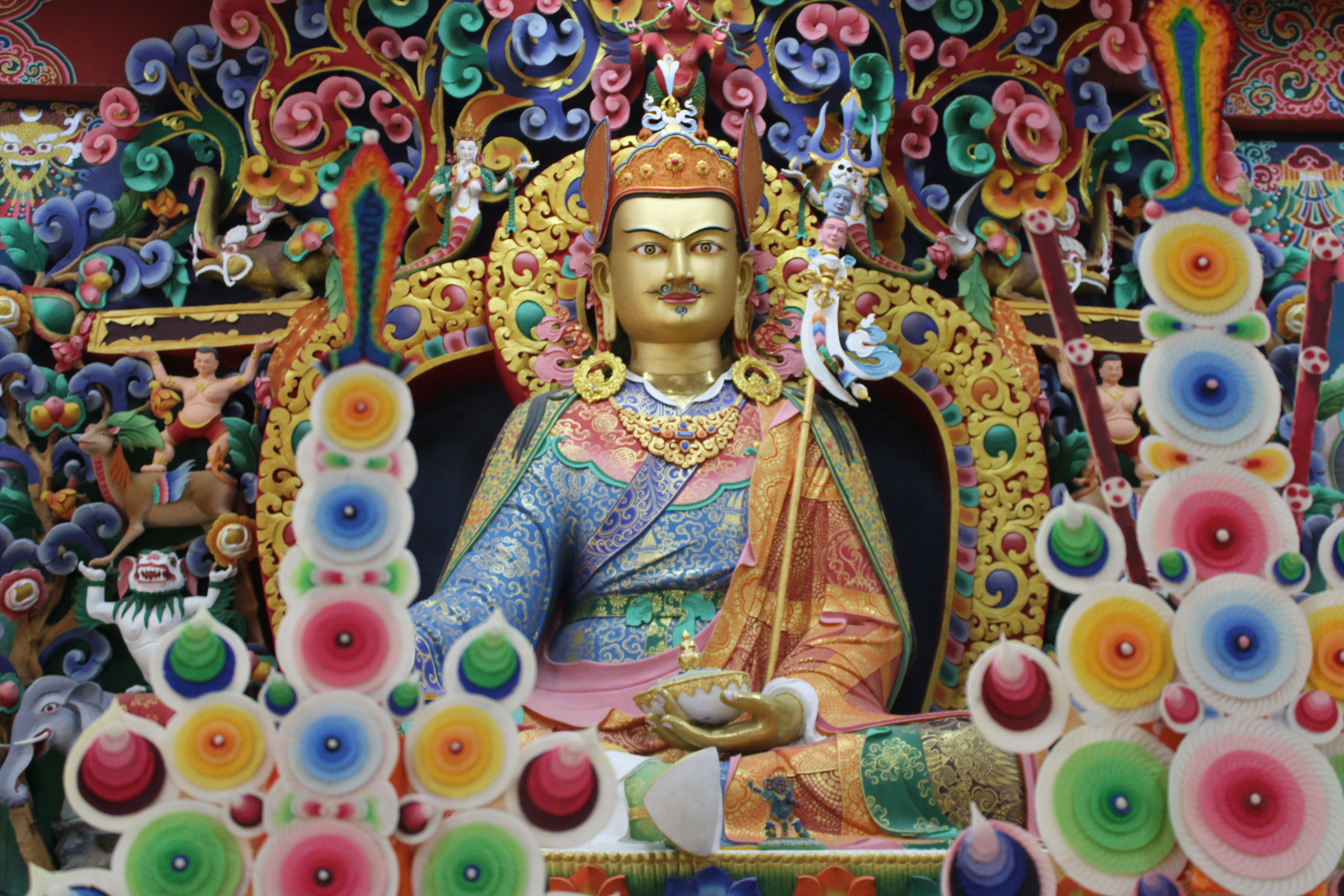
Guru Rinpochey. Padmasambhava

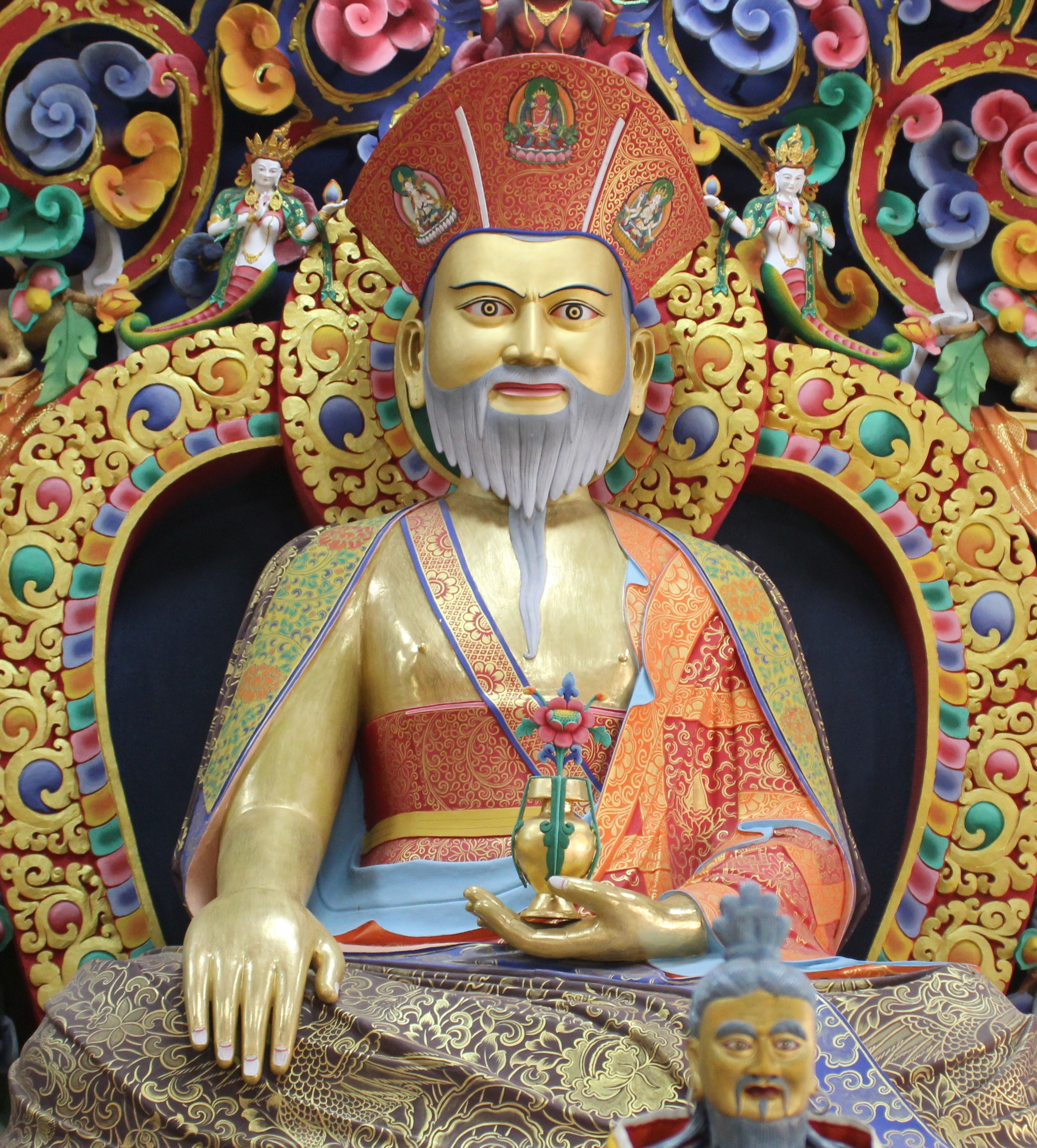
Zhabdrung Rinpoche Ngawang Namgyal ཞབས་དྲུང་རིན་པོ་ཆེ་མཁྱེན་ནོ། །

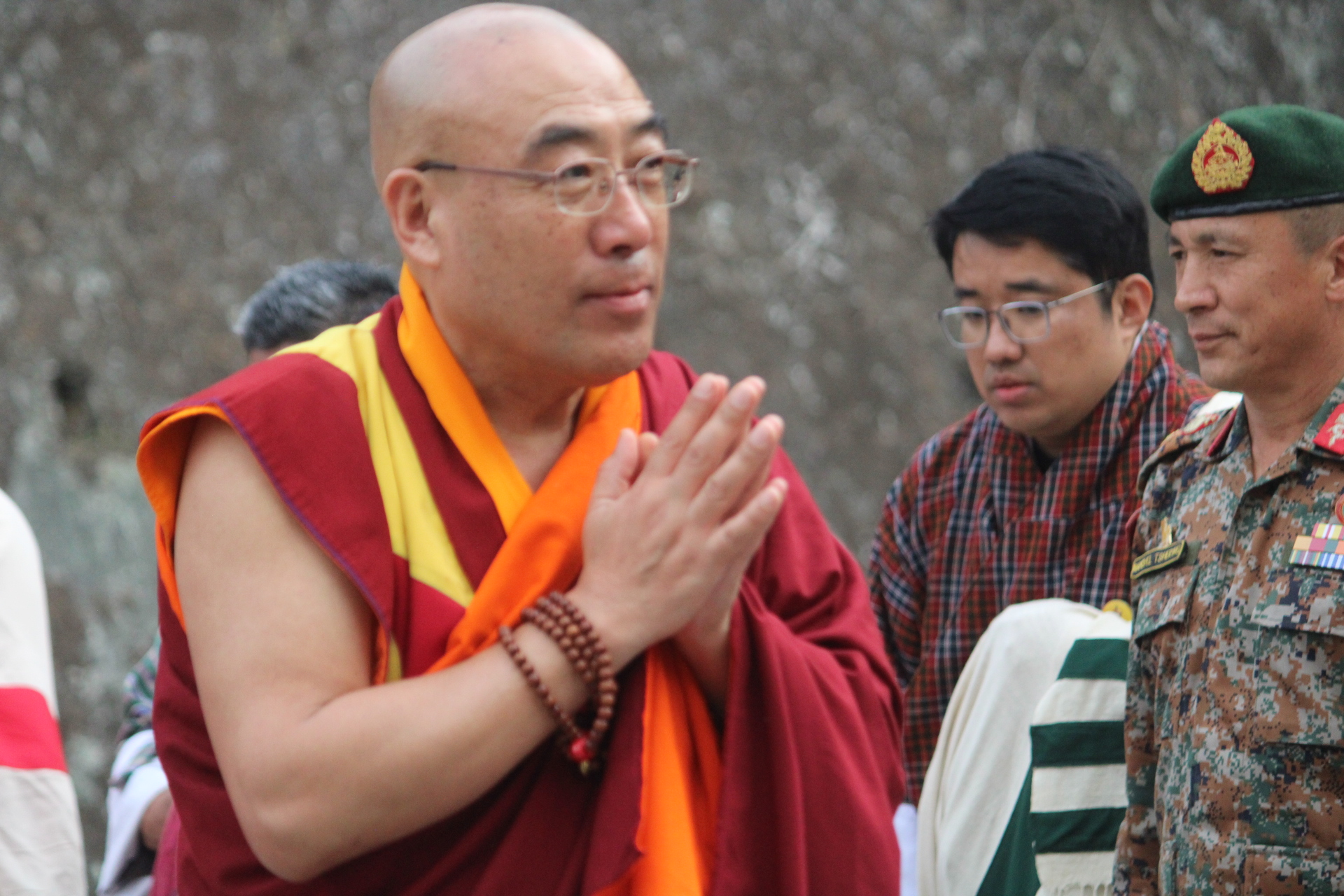
The Current Spiritual Minister. Tshogki Lopen. Khenchen Sangay Khandu.

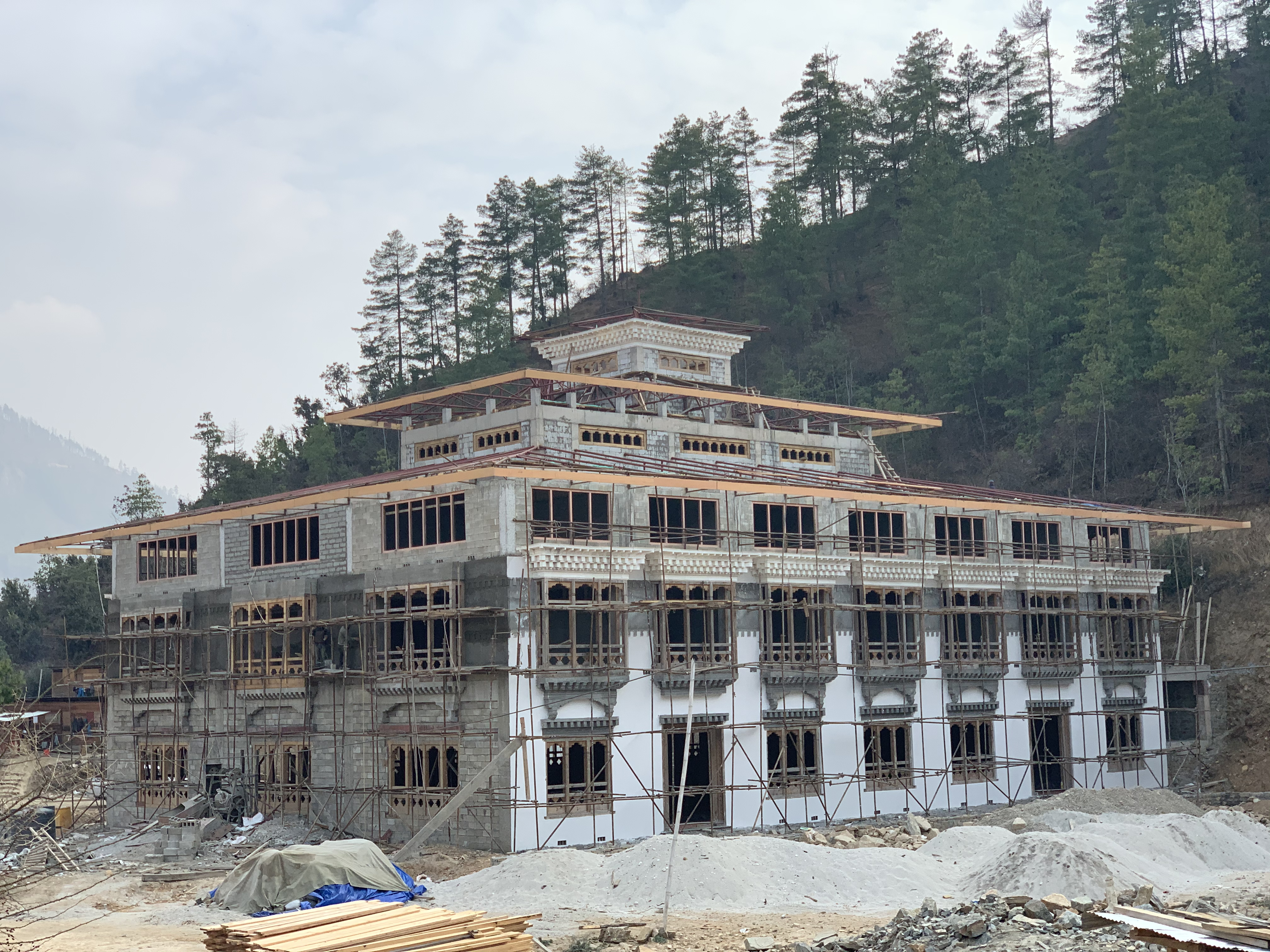
Construction of the new Tshokhang.

Serlung Pekar Choeling Buddhist Institute (Dzongkha: གསེར་ལུང་དགོན་འཛིན་འདུས་སྡེ་ལུང་རྟོགས་ཆོས་གླིང་), also known as Silung Goenpa, is a 600-year-old monastery in Dawakha, Paro, Bhutan. The Goenpa is a seat of Thang Thong Gyalpo (Dzongkha: ཐང་སྟོང་རྒྱལ་པོ།), also known as The Bridge Builder (ལྕགས་བཟོ་པ།). Gyalpo was a legendary to construct first suspension bridges using iron chains. He built a total of 58 bridges across Tibet and Bhutan.

The monastery is also known for its lake, which is believed to be sacred. A ritual is held every three years near the lake led by a female shaman (pawo).

The monastery was handed over to the Dratshang Lhentshog by the public in 2005. Her Majesty the Royal Grandmother, Ashi Kesang Choeden Wangchuck ( Bhutan: ཨ་ཞེ་སྐལ་བཟང་ཆོས་སྒྲོན།) funded a thongdrel(མཐོང་གྲོལ) for the monastery in 2015, which took one year to complete.

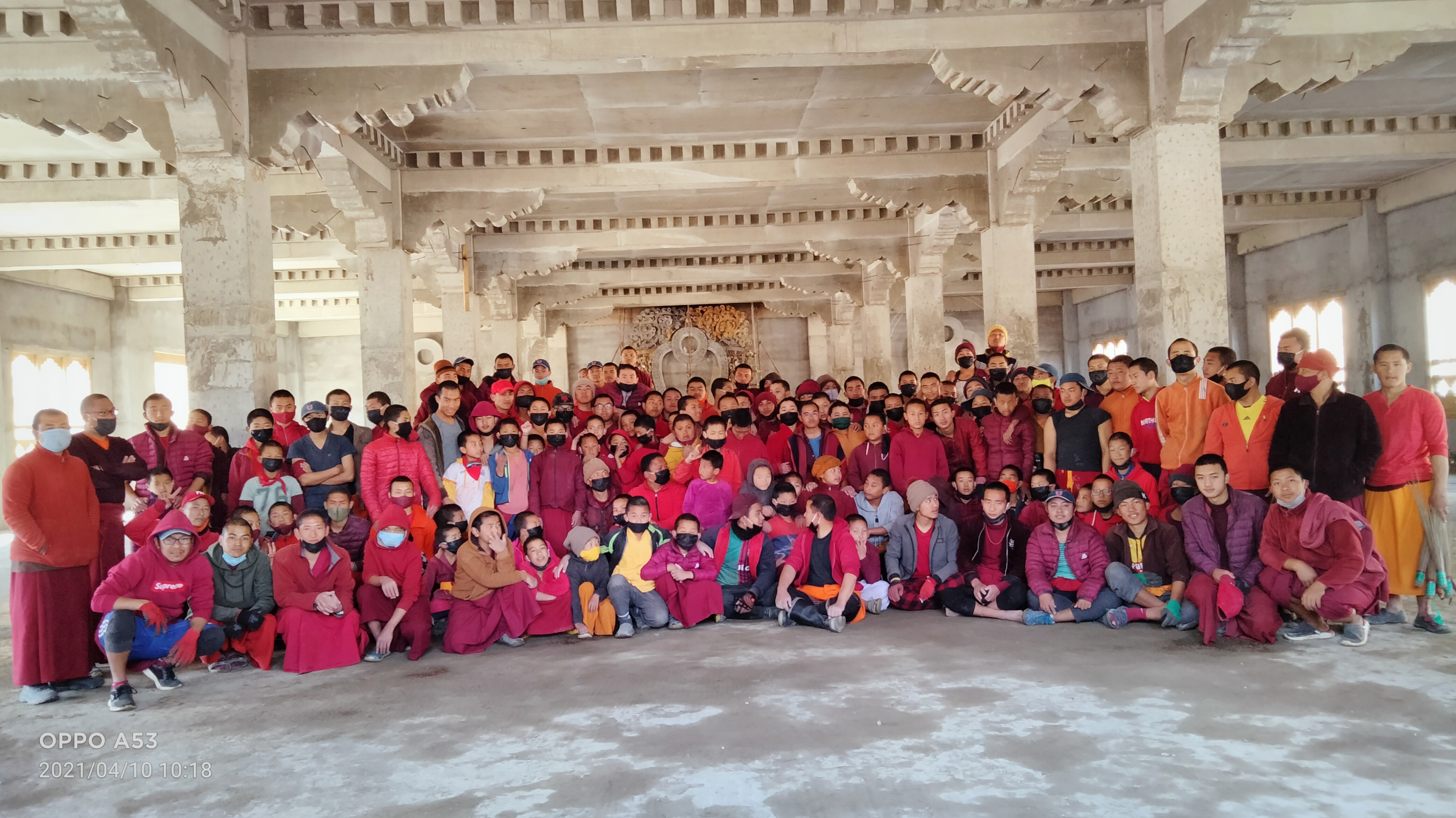
Serlung Monastery; doing work for temple. 2019

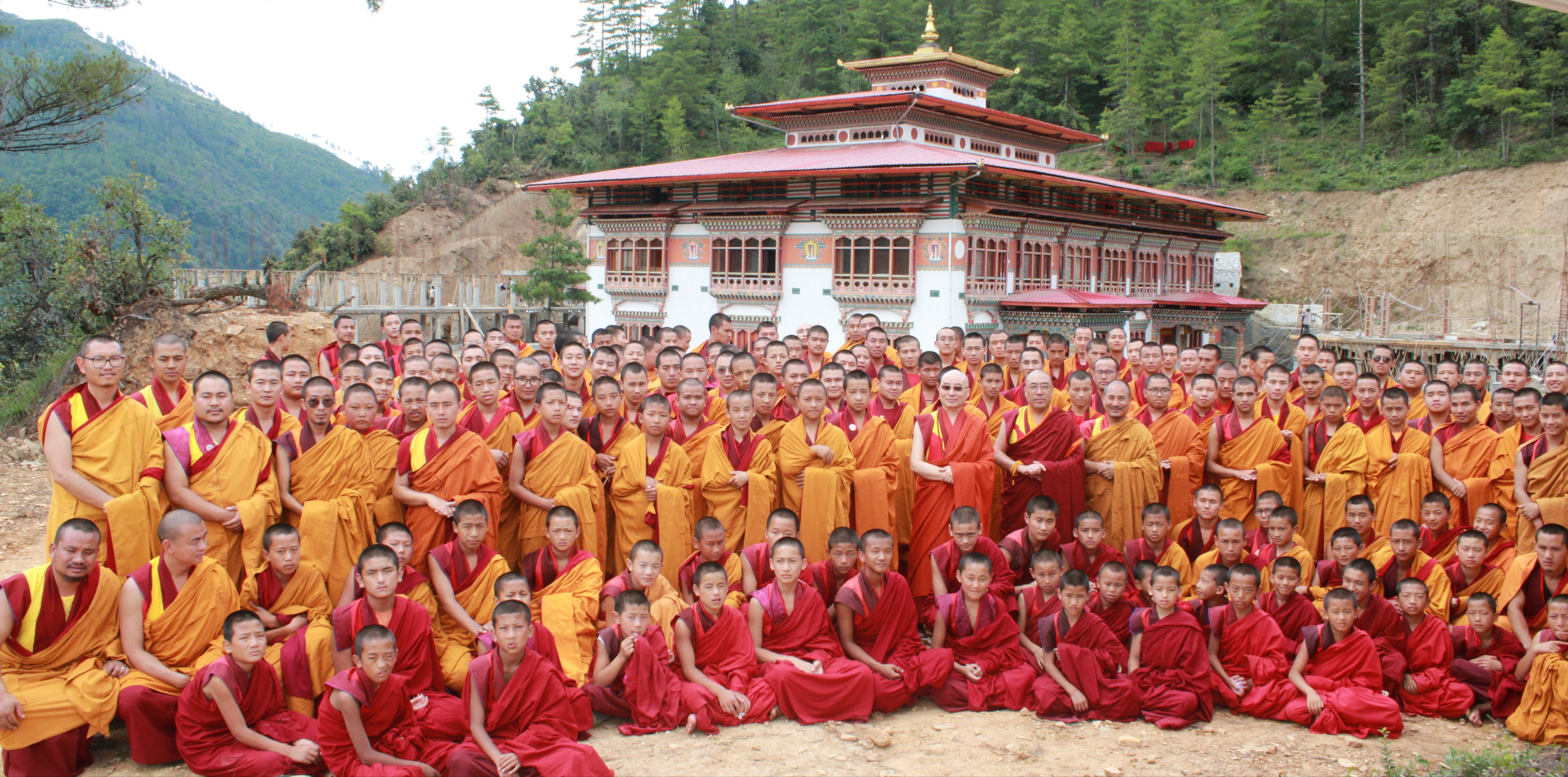
The 250 monks line up outside the new Tshokhang (four-storey hall) at Serlung Monastery. 2023

The monastery housed just 16 monks in 2015 but has since been expanded. Tshogki lopen(ཚོགས་ཀྱི་སློབ་དཔོན།) Sangay Khandu and Khepo Karma Loday donated Nu 160 million for construction of a four-storey multipurpose hall, which was consecrated in October, 2023, by the Je Khenpo.

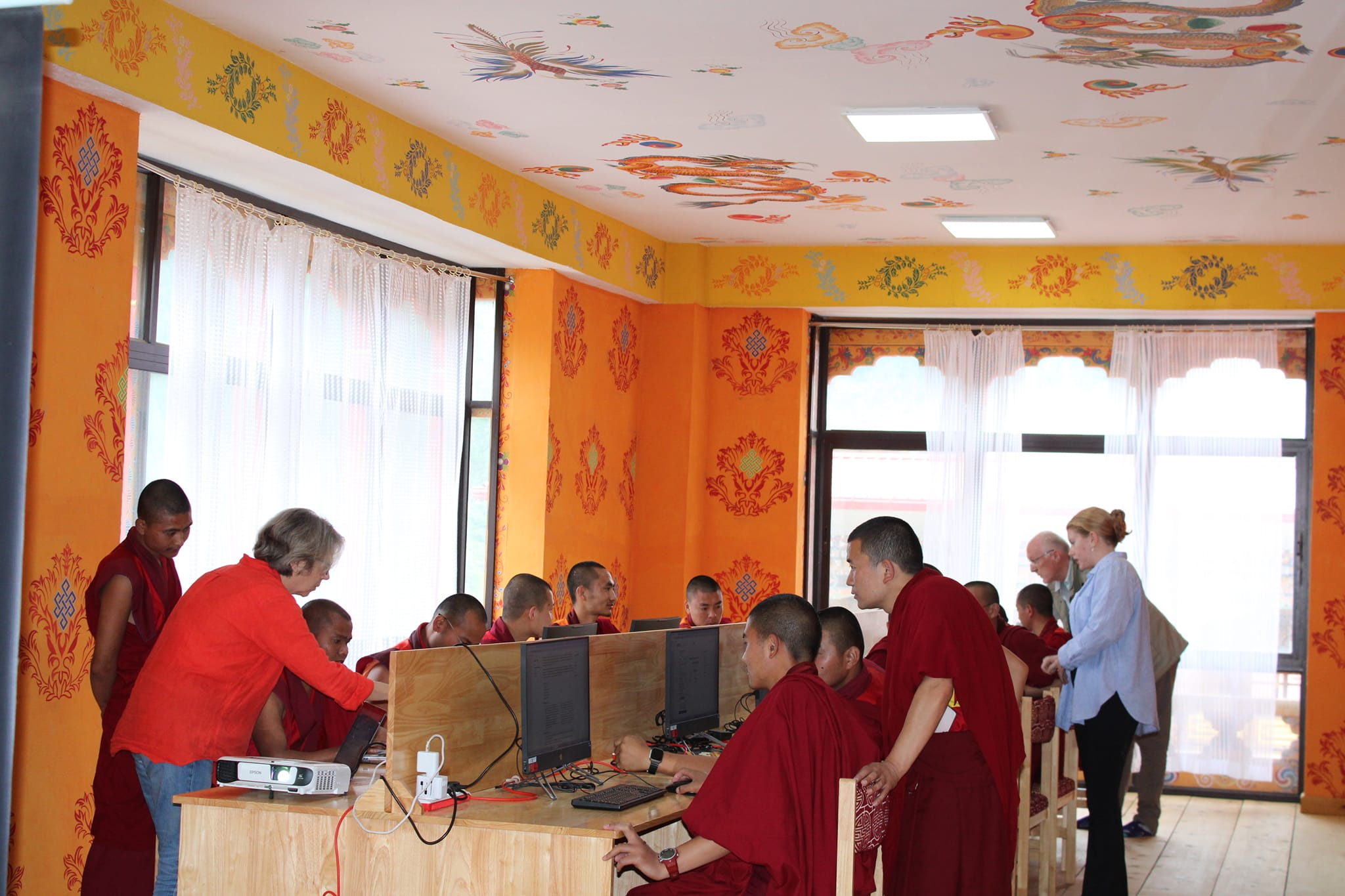
Monks at Serlung Monastery at an editing workshop for Dzongkha Wikipedia

Since 2018, it has been used as a summer residence for the pasakha monks and monastery was established as a Goenzin Dratshang. At that time, the principal of the monastery was Kuenzang Tobgay Namgyel, who was the first principal of Goenzin Dratshang. There were other heads before that, but the monastery was not a Goenzin Dratshang until then.

The old Tshokhang could house only 60 monks which is why a new Tshokhang was constructed. Hostels around the Tshokhang are still under construction. On the ground floor, in the Great Hall, the main sacred relic is CHOE -LONG -TRUEL-SUM (the Buddha, Zhabdrung and Guru Rinpoche ). The first floor has a library, study room and offices, the second floor has rooms for teachers and senior monks. The third floor is a Dolma (GreenTara སྒྲོལ་ལྗངས) altar. Currently there are 250 monks including teachers at the institute.

In 2023, the World Wildlife Fund in collaboration with Tarayana Foundation, funded a Nu 1.3 million project to provide water to around 254 households in the Dawakha gewog, as well as Serlung Monastery, providing them with clean drinking water on tap.

== History ==
The Serlung Monastery was established in 2018 as a Goenzin Dratshang. His Holiness the Je Khenpo renamed the monastery as Serlung Goenzin Dhuedhay Lungtog Choeling Dratshang in 2023.

The monastery took its name, Serlung, from the sacred lake located near the temple. The people living in the area faced hard times since they didn’t have rain during their cultivation. There were two lakes with two nymphs (mother and daughter) at Hoshala, which is located about 12 km from the monastery. People believed that defiling the lake could bring rain, so the villagers started throwing dead bodies into the lake. The mother and daughter nymphs could not live at Hoshala Lake anymore because people had polluted their residence. So, they planned to move to Dagkala. However, the daughter could not move to Dagkala because she had a pain on her leg during the journey. The mother advised the daughter to stay and serve as the protector of the Dharma. She left her Sergi Alung (golden hook), making the place known as Serlung Goenpa.

=== Thang Tong Gyalpo's Inspiration ===
Thang Tong Gyalpo’s engineering feats, particularly with regard to bridge building, were reportedly inspired after he was refused passage on a ferry because of his ferocious and unkempt outward appearance. He was thrown unceremoniously into the water only to emerge with an insatiable zest for building bridges and ferry points. Thang tong Gyalpo (ཐང་སྟོང་རྒྱལ་པོ) was known for his eccentricity. He rode horses into shrine rooms, feasted on rotting horse meat, considering it a delicacy. He was given the moniker "the madman of the empty land".
