= Zamazingka =

- District of Thimphu
- Country: Bhutan
- District: Thimphu District
- City: Thimphu

Zamazingka is an eastern district of Thimphu, Bhutan. It is located across the Wang Chu River from the city centre. The main road is Dechen Lam, which follows the line of the river and connects the district to Yangchenphug in the north and eventually leads to Paro in the south.
