= Order of Great Victory of the Thunder Dragon =

Order of Great Victory of the Thunder Dragon (Druk Wangyel)

Awarded by Bhutan
- Type: Order
- Awarded for: as the country’s principal civilian honour
- Status: Currently constituted
- Sovereign: Jigme Khesar Namgyel Wangchuck
- Grades: First Class; Second Class

Precedence
- Next (higher): Order of the Dragon King
- Next (lower): Royal Order of Bhutan
- Ribbon bar of the order

The Order of Great Victory of the Thunder Dragon (Dzongkha : Druk Wangyel / Druk Wangyal) is the Highest Civilian Decoration in Bhutan awarded in recognition for outstanding dedication, loyalty and commitment. Instituted by King Jigme Dorji Wangchuck on 9 February 1967 and reorganized by King Jigme Singye Wangchuck on 29 September 1985 as the country's principal national honour, it was redesigned and instituted as the Second Highest Honor in the kingdom. The decoration consists of a Badge and a Star. Its postnominal letter is DWG.

== Ranks ==
It is composed of two classes :

- First Class.
- Second Class.

== Insignia ==
=== General disposition ===
The general disposition of the insignia depend on the recipient's dress:

In National dress:

- First Class: a badge worn from a large neck ribbon and a star with a ribbon on the left breast.
- Second Class: a badge worn from a large neck ribbon.

In European dress or uniform:

- First Class: The badge hanging from a sash and a breast star on the left breast.
- Second Class: The badge hanging from a sash (no breast star).

The Bhutanese National Flag

=== Details ===
The 60 mm badge consists of a gold-plated back plate consisting of crossed dorji (crossed thunderbolt) with lattice work, and an enamelled flag of Bhutan with beaded gold edge, with the dragon mounted in gold.

The 80 mm breast star consists of a large ornate gold-plated back plate with silver trumpets (dhung) individually pegged onto back star. The centre is an enamelled flag of Bhutan, with the dragon in gold, identical to the badge.

The ribbon is dark orange.

== Notable recipients ==
- Indira Gandhi, Former Prime Minister of India (30 September 1985, posthumous).
- Jigme Yoser Thinley, Former Prime Minister of Bhutan (17 December 2008).
- Sonam Tobgye, Chief Justice of Bhutan (17 December 2008).
- Dorji Lopen Kinley, Senior Lopen (17 December 2019).
