= Buddhism in Bhutan =

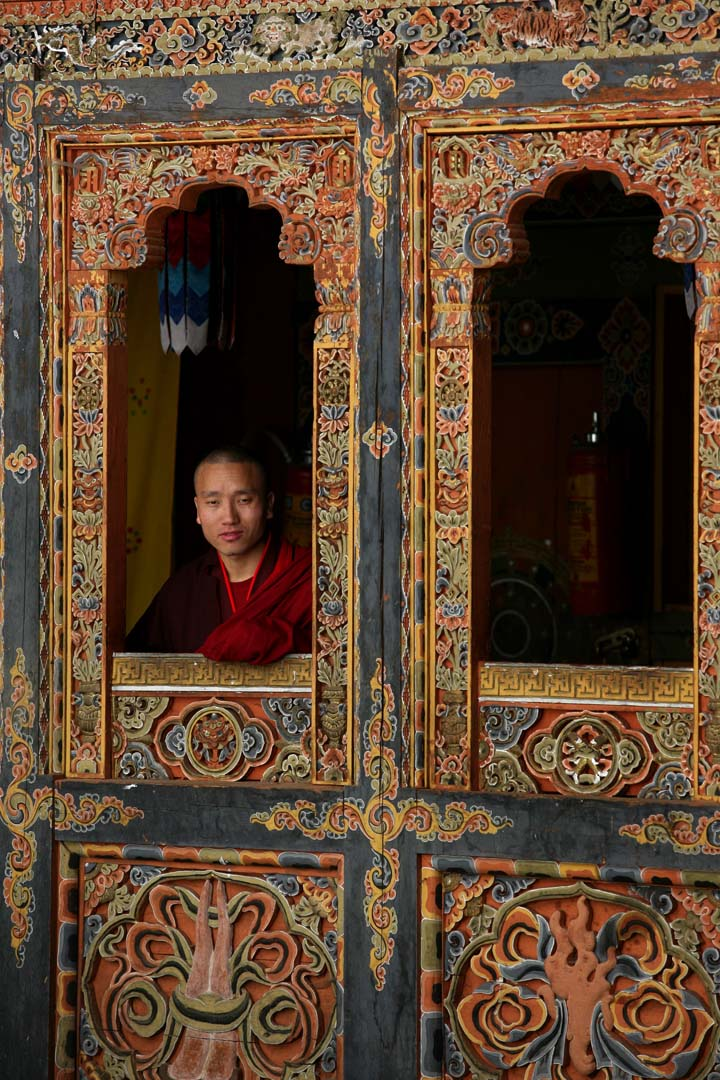
Bhutanese Buddhist monk looking out the window of a monastery

Buddhism is the state religion of Bhutan. According to a 2012 report by the Pew Research Center, 74.7% of the country's population practices Buddhism.

Although the Buddhism practiced in Bhutan originated in Tibetan Buddhism, it differs significantly in its rituals, liturgy, and monastic organization. The state religion has long been supported financially by the government through annual subsidies to Buddhist monasteries, shrines, monks, and nuns. In the modern era, support of the state religion during the reign of Jigme Dorji Wangchuck includes the manufacture of 10,000 gilded bronze images of the Buddha, publication of elegant calligraphic editions of the 108-volume Kangyur (Collection of the Words of the Buddha) and the 225-volume Tengyur (Collection of Commentaries), and the construction of numerous chorten (stupas) throughout the country. Guaranteed representation in the National Assembly and the Royal Advisory Council, Buddhists constitute the majority of society and are assured an influential voice in public policy.

== Organizations ==
In 1989 some 1,000 monks (lam, or gelong, novices) belonged to the Central Monastic Body in Thimphu and Punakha, and some 4,000 monks belonged to district monastic bodies. The hierarchy is headed by the Je Khenpo, who was assisted by five lopons or masters, each in charge of religious tradition, liturgy, lexicography, or logic and university. The lonpon, one of whom, the Dorji Lonpon, normally succeeded the current Je Khenpo, had under them religious administrators and junior monastic officials in charge of art, music, and other areas. Gelugpa monks were celibate, but Nyingmapas consist of not only monks but also householders, allowing them to marry, raise families, and work in secular occupations while performing liturgical functions in temples and homes. In all, there were some 12,000 monks in Bhutan in the late 1980s. There were also active congregations of nuns, but no figures were readily available. Most of Bhutan's Buddhists are adherents of the Drukpa subsect of the Kargyupa (literally, oral transmission) school, one of the four major schools of Tibetan Buddhism.

Since July 2002, Menjong Chöthün Tshogpa, currently a nationwide non-profit organization in Bhutan, has been formed by Truku Jigme Chödrag Rinpoche 70th Kyabje Dorjechang, known as the Supreme Dharma King or His Holiness of Bhutan, mainly to preserve the indigenous Buddha's Teachings as their age-old culture and tradition. Subsequently, Trizin Tsering Rimpoche was enthroned as the chairman by Truku Jigme Chödrag Rinpoche since June 2003.

Later in 2004, Trizin Tsering Rimpoche founded the Buddha Dordenma Image Foundation, under the patronage of Truku Jigme Chödrag Rinpoche, with an aim to fulfill a former prophecy in a terma of Guru Padmasambhava to bestow blessings on world peace and glorious happiness through the currently running Buddha Dordenma Project.

=== The Zhabdrung ===
Prior to 1907, the highest Buddhist leader in Bhutan was the Zhabdrung, a tulku who is seen as the reincarnation of Bhutan's founder. His formal activity to benefit all sentient beings is destined to occur in seven lives, each with his own prophecy.

== Monasteries ==
Monasteries and convents are common in Bhutan. Both monks and nuns keep their heads shaved and wear distinguishing maroon robes. Their days are spent in study and meditation but also in the performance of rituals honoring various bodhisattvas, praying for the dead, and seeking the intercession of bodhisattvas on behalf of the ill. Some of their prayers involved chants and singing accompanied by conch shell trumpets, trumpets made from human thighbones, metal horns up to three meters long, large standing drums and cymbals, hand bells, temple bells, gongs, and wooden sticks. Such monastic music and singing, not normally heard by the general public, has been reported to have "great virility" and to be more melodious than its Tibetan monotone counterparts. Common people do practice the religion in their own ways: day to day works, in their speech, in their thought and visiting the holy place and persons on holy dates (holy dates are the 8, 10, 15, 25, 28 and 30th day in a month in Bhutanese calendar).

== Buildings and objects ==
To bring Buddhism to the people, numerous symbols and structures are employed. Religious monuments, prayer walls, prayer flags, and sacred mantras carved in stone hillsides are prevalent. Among the religious monuments are chorten, the Bhutanese version of the Indian stupa. They range from simple rectangular "house" chorten to complex edifices with ornate steps, doors, domes, and spires. Some are decorated with the Buddha's eyes that see in all directions simultaneously. These earth, brick, or stone structures commemorate deceased kings, Buddhist saints, venerable monks, and other notables, and sometimes they serve as reliquaries. Prayer walls are made of laid or piled stone and inscribed with Tantric prayers. Prayers printed with woodblocks on cloth are made into tall, narrow, colorful prayer flags, which are then mounted on long poles and placed both at holy sites and at dangerous locations to ward off demons and to benefit the spirits of the dead. To help propagate the faith, itinerant monks travel from village to village carrying portable shrines with many small doors, which open to reveal statues and images of the Buddha, bodhisattvas, and notable lamas.

== Bön in Bhutan ==
Before the introduction of Buddhism, Bön religion was prevalent in Bhutan. Bön continues to be practised in modern Bhutan.

== See also ==
- Religion in Bhutan
- Freedom of religion in Bhutan
- Bhutanese art
- Dratshang Lhentshog
- Dual system of government
- Buddhism in Nepal

== Bibliography ==
- Marks, Thomas A. (1977). "Historical Observations on Buddhism in Bhutan". The Tibet Journal. 2 (2): 74–91. JSTOR 43299858.
