= Yangchenphug =

- District of Thimphu
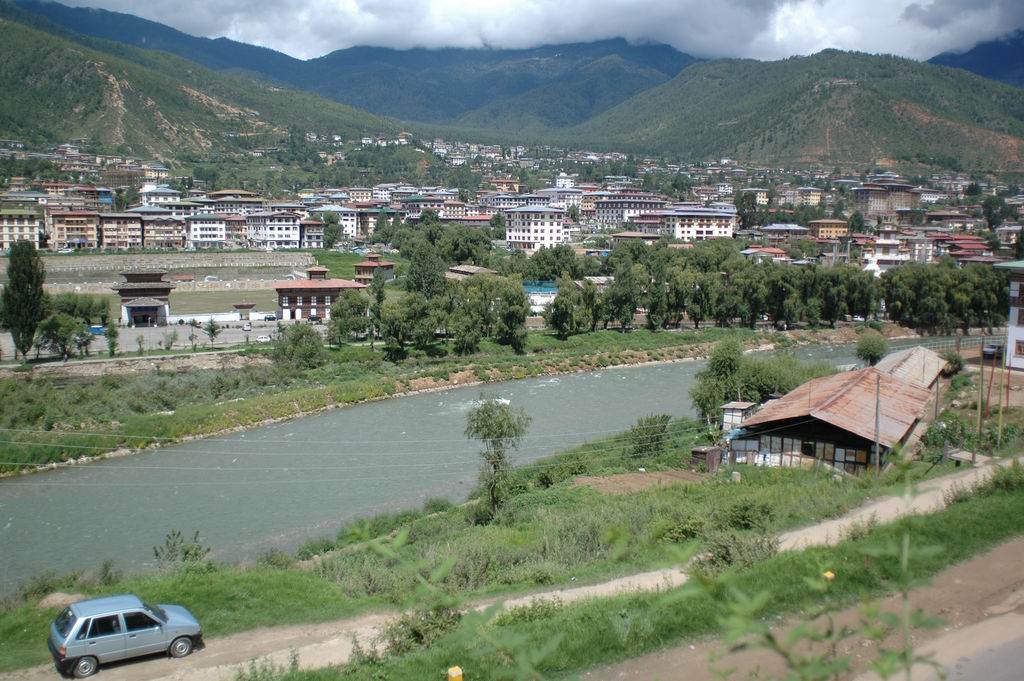
- View of the main part of the city from Yangchenphug
- Nickname: Dolom
- Country: Bhutan
- District: Thimphu District
- City: Thimphu

Yangchenphug is an eastern district of Thimphu, Bhutan. It is located across the Wang Chu River from the city centre and contains the Lungten Zampa School and Yangchenphug High School. The main road is Dechen Lam which follows the line of the river and connects the district to Zamazingka in the south.
