= Tashichho Dzong =

Fortress in Thimphu, Bhutan

- Tibetan transcription(s); Tibetan:

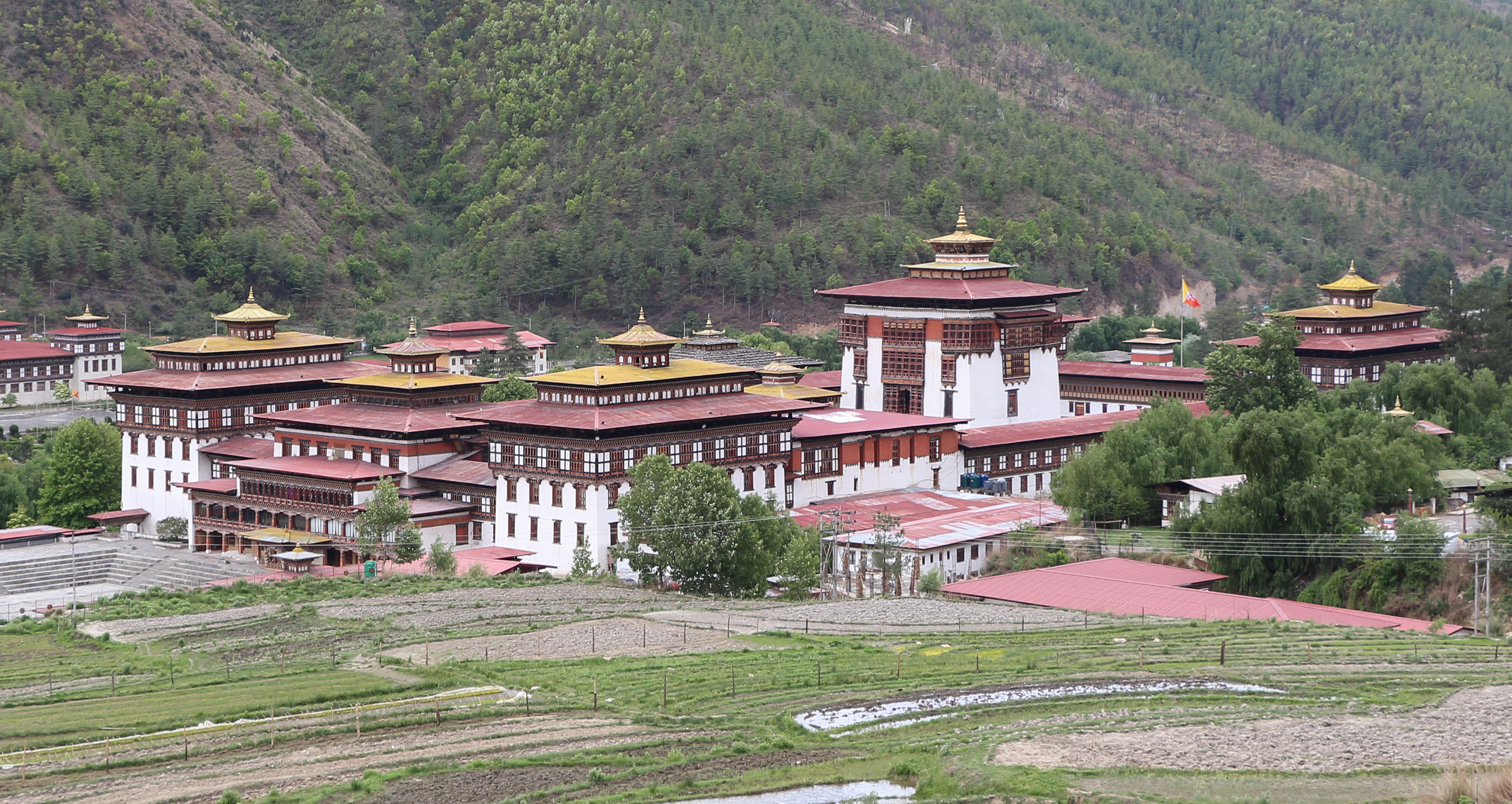
- View of Tashichho Dzong

Religion
- Affiliation: Tibetan Buddhism

Location
- Country: Bhutan
- Interactive map of Tashichho Dzong
- Coordinates: 27°29′23″N 89°38′6″E

Architecture
- Established: 1216; 810 years ago

Tashichho Dzong (Dzongkha: བཀྲ་ཤིས་ཆོས་རྫོང) is a Buddhist monastery and fortress on the northern edge of the city of Thimphu in Bhutan, on the western bank of the Wang Chu. It has traditionally been the seat of the Druk Desi (or "Deb Raja"), the head of Bhutan's civil government, an office which has been combined with the kingship since the creation of the monarchy in 1907, and summer capital of the country. In old British documents, it is known as Tassisudon.

According to a 1922 traveller:

It was built by the first Dharma Raja, who also founded the Lho-drukpa sect of Buddhism, which has remained the distinctive sect of Bhutan. The correct transliteration of the vernacular name—Bkrashis-chhos-rdzong, meaning "the fortress of auspicious doctrine"—is, according to Graham Sandberg, Tashichhoidzong.

The main structure of the whitewashed building is two-storied with three-storied towers at each of the four corners topped by triple-tiered golden roofs. There is also a large central tower or utse.

== History ==
The original Thimphu dzong (the Do-Ngön Dzong, or Blue Stone Dzong) was built in 1216 by Lama Gyalwa Lhanapa (1164–1224), founder of the Lhapa branch of the Drikung Kagyu, at the place where Dechen Phodrang Monastery now stands on a ridge above the present Tashichö-dzong. In 1641 Zhabdrung Ngawang Namgyal took over that Dzong from the Lhapa Kagyu, reconsecrated, and renamed it Tashichö-Dzong. It was then established as the main seat of the Southern Drukpa Kagyu and the summer residence of the monastic body or sangha headed by Shabdrung Rinpoche. Most of this original dzong was destroyed by fire in 1772 and a new dzong was built at the present site by the sixteenth Desi, Sonam Lhudrup, and it was then consecrated by the thirteenth Je Khenpo, Je Yonten Taye, who named the new Dzong Sonamchö-dzong. Following the death of the Desi it was renamed Tashichö-dzong after the old Dzong.

Tashichö Dzong was again destroyed by fire three different times as well seriously damaged by an earthquake in 1897. Each time it was rebuilt by the Desi and Je Khenpo of the time. In 1962, after the capital was moved from Punakha to Thimphu, the present Dzong was rebuilt by the third king, Jigme Dorji Wangchuck, as the seat of Government following a different plan from the old one. Only the central Utse tower, the Lhakhang Sarp (new temple), and main Gönkhang (protector temple) remain from the earlier Dzong. After its completion in 1968, the new Tashichö Dzong was consecrated by the 66th Je Khenpo Yonten Tarchin; the 16th Karmapa, Rangjung Rigpai Dorje; and Je Kudre, Jamyang Yeshe.

Tashichö Dzong (meaning Fortress of the glorious religion) has been the seat of Bhutan's government since 1968. It presently houses the throne room and offices of the king, the cabinet secretariat and the ministries of home affairs and finance. Some other government departments are housed in buildings to the south of the Dzong, and others in new buildings in Thimphu. West of the dzong is a small tower of Ney Khang Lhakhang which houses a statue of Shakyamuni Buddha and protective deities. In 1953 the royal family took up residence in the newly built Dechencholing Palace.

In 1777, during the time of the 18th Desi, Jigme Singye, the Kunrey (assembly hall of the monks) in the Dzong was renovated, as it was totally dark inside. It was further renovated by the 25th Desi, Pema Cheda, in 1807. Phurgyal, during his tenure as the 32nd Desi, added the Ditsang lhakhang in 1826 and installed many new statues. In 2002 a newly built Neten Chudrug (16 arhats, those who had extinguished all defilements) Thongdrol was consecrated and added by His Holiness the Je Khenpo. The northern portion is the summer residence of the Je Khenpo and the Central Monastic Body.

== Temples and chapels in the Dzong ==
There are thirty temples, chapels and shrines within Tashichö-Dzong.

== Gallery ==
Tashichödzong
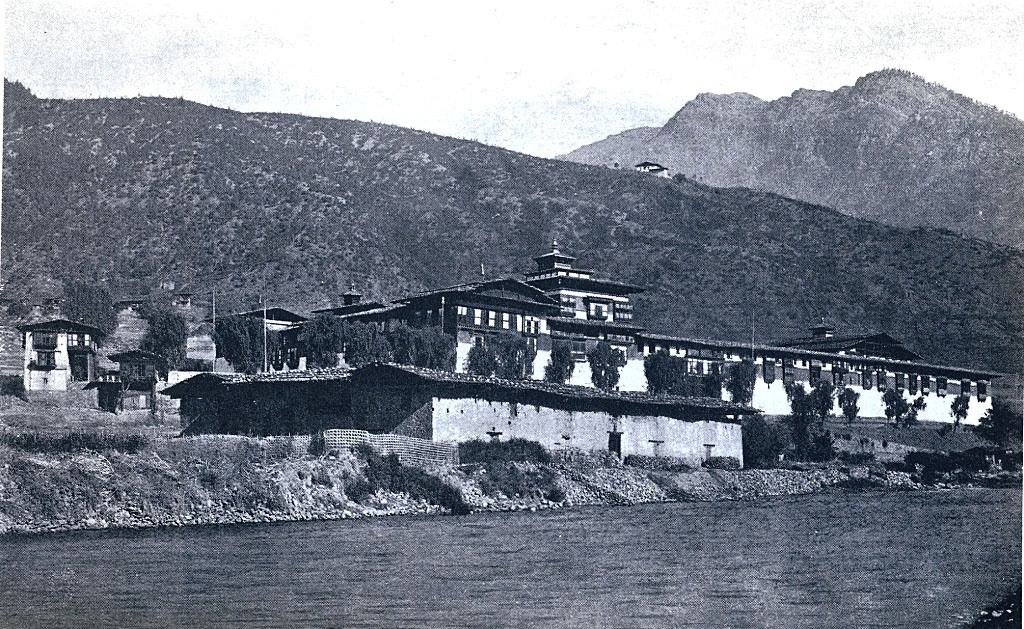
Tashichödzong in 1921

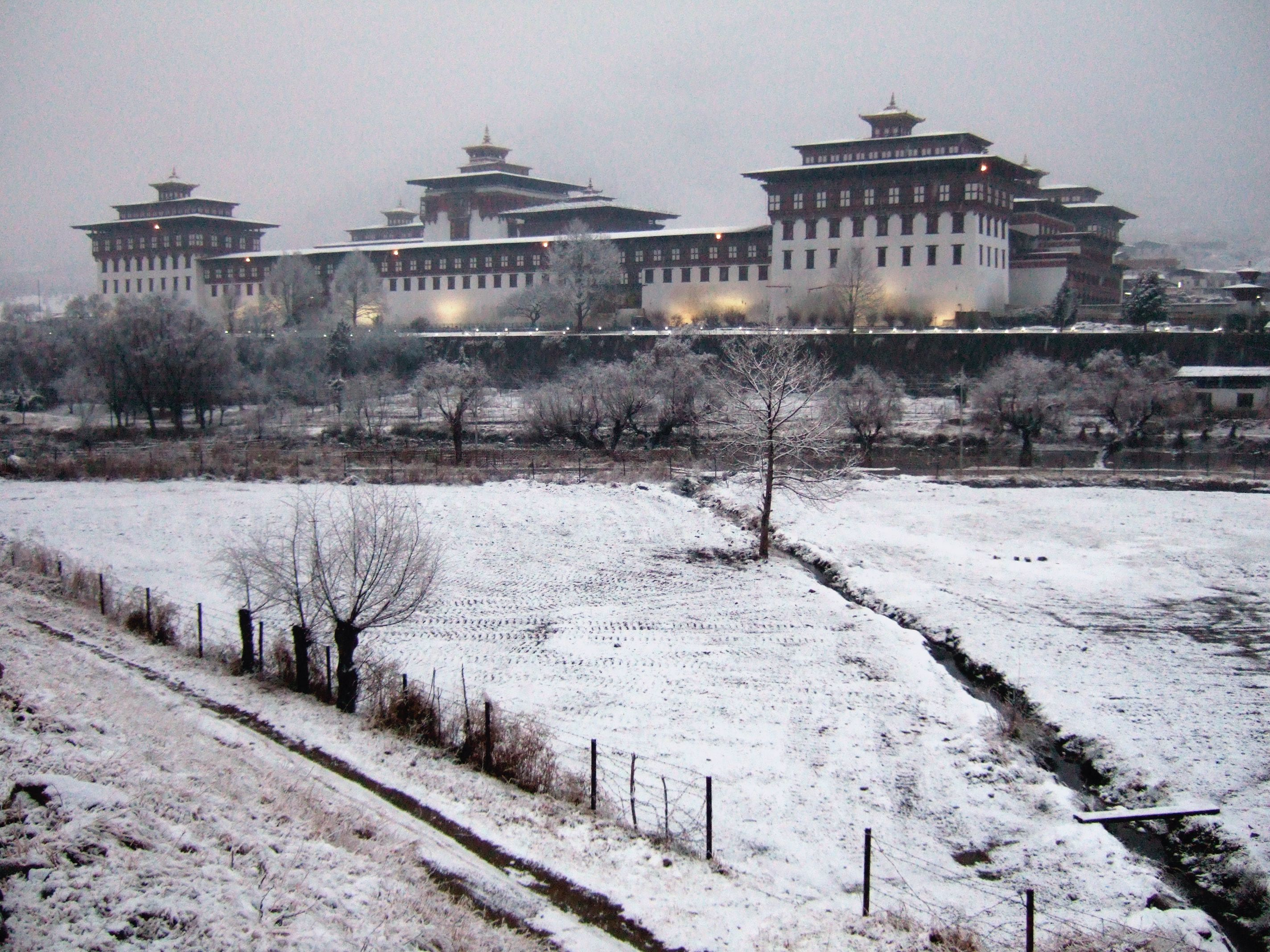
Tashichödzong in winter

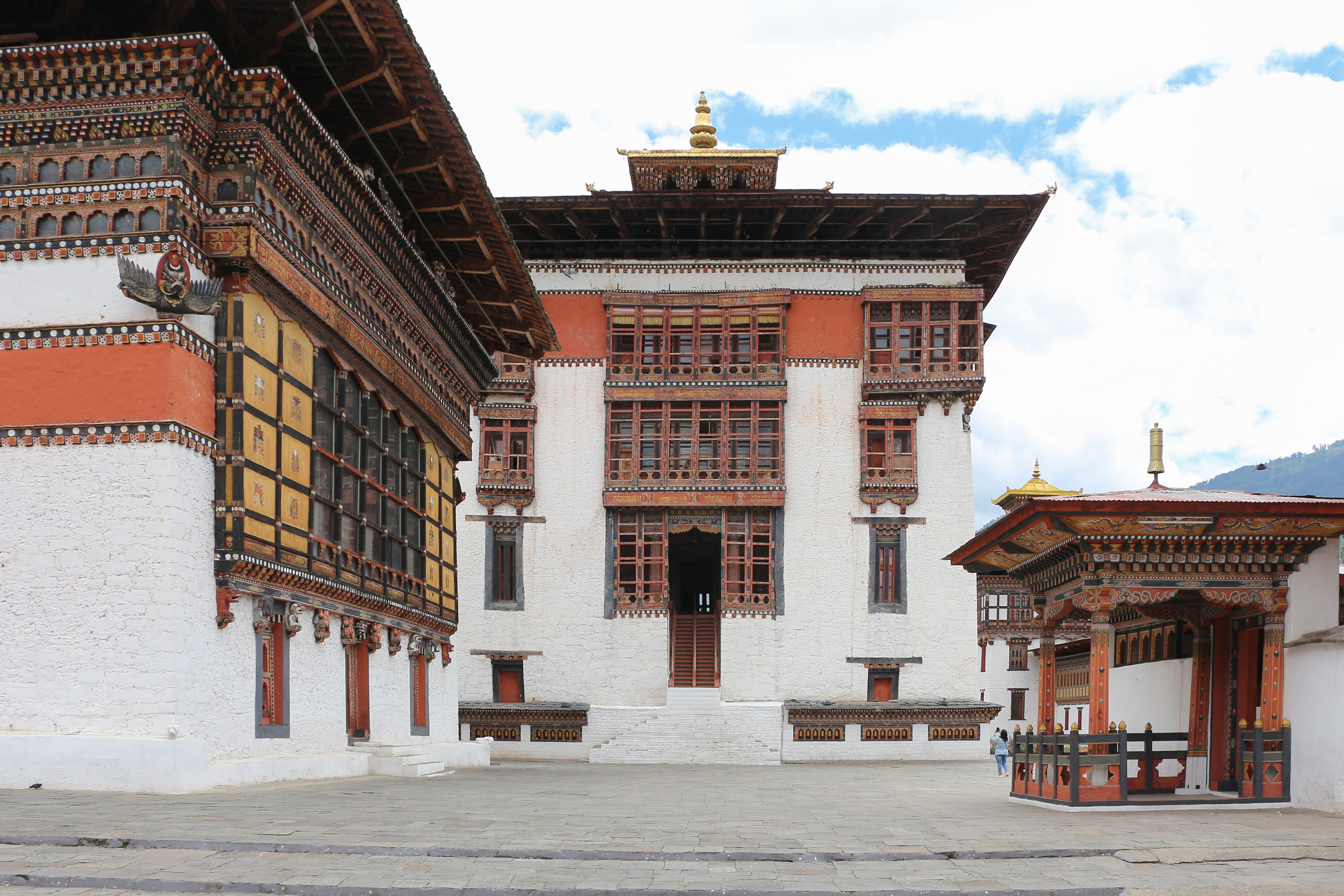
The Utse, or Central Tower, of Tashichödzong

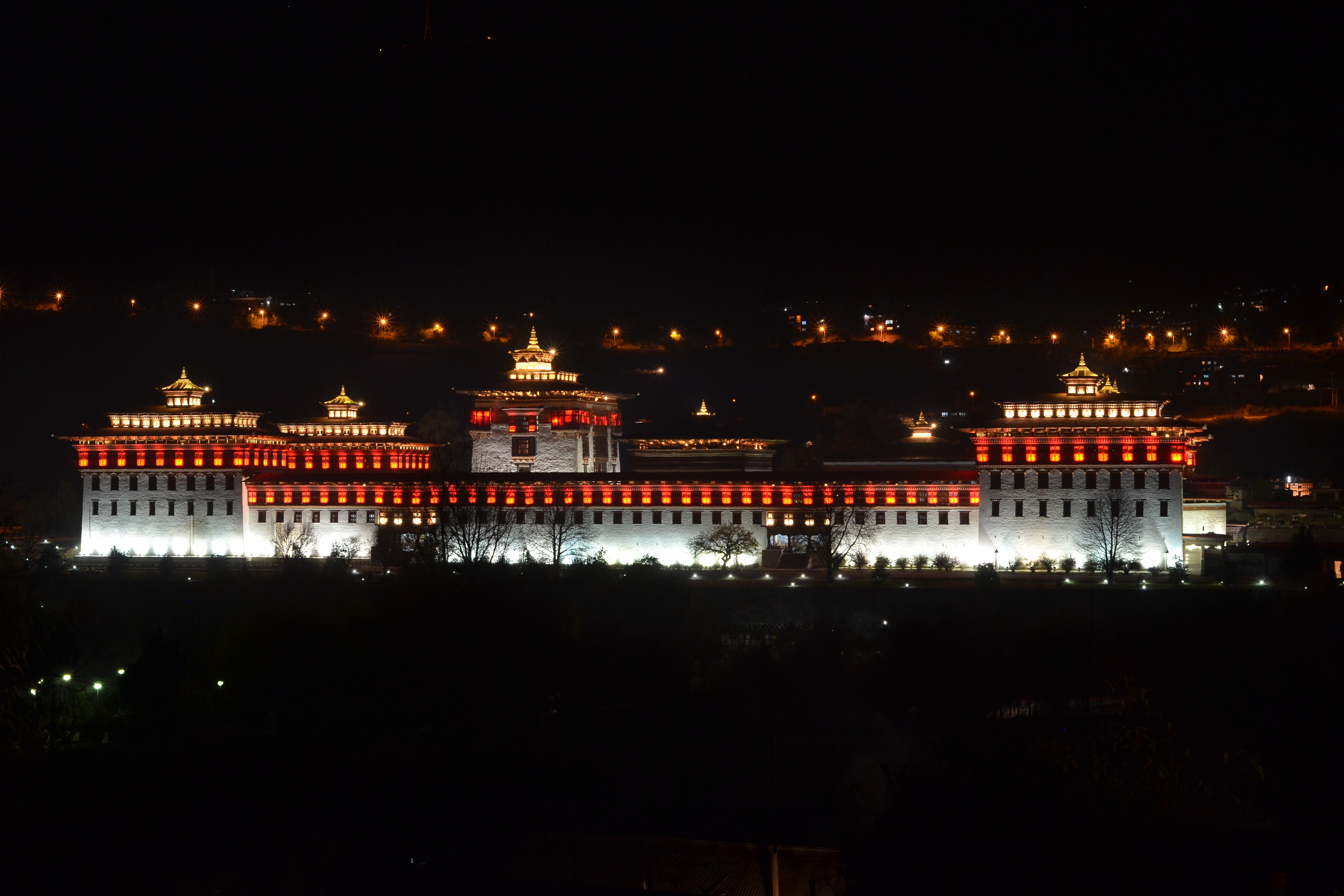
Tashichodzong at night

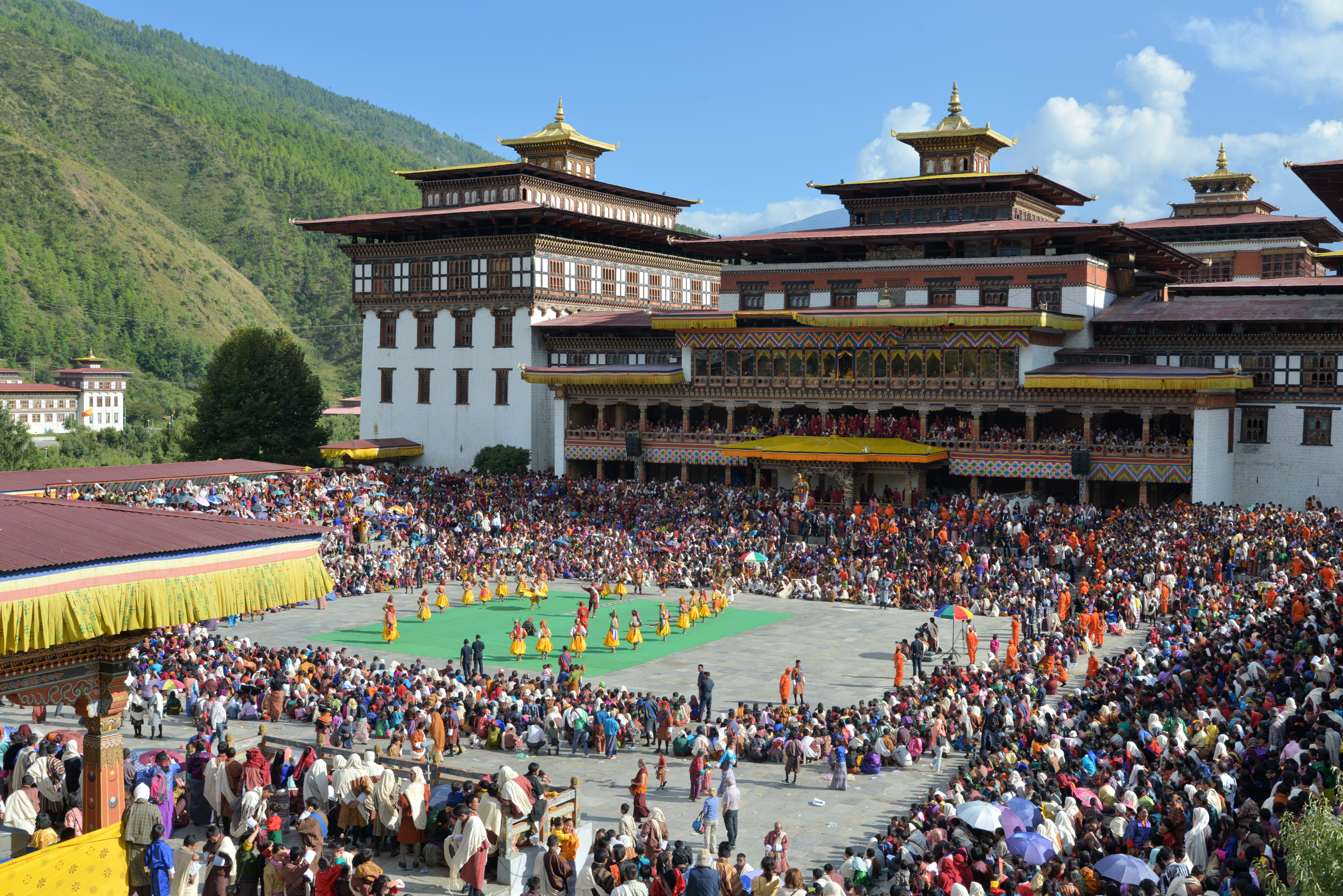
Tsechu festival at Tashichödzong
