= Dratshang Lhentshog =

Bhutanese government agency

The Dratshang Lhentshog (Dzongkha: གྲྭ་ཚང་ལྷན་ཚོགས་; Wylie: grwa-tshang lhan-tshogs) is the Commission for the Monastic Affairs of Bhutan. Under the 2008 Constitution, it is the bureaucracy that oversees the Drukpa Kagyu sect of Tibetan Buddhism, which is the state religion of Bhutan. Although Bhutan has a state religion, the role of the religious bureaucracy is ideally meant to complement secular institutions within a dual system of government.

== Composition and function ==
Under the 2008 Constitution, the Dratshang Lhentshog is made up of seven members: the Je Khenpo serves as the chairman, with the Five Lopons (Dzongkha: སློབ་དཔོན་ལྔ་; Wylie: slob-dpon lnga) of the Zhung Dratshang (Dzongkha: གཞུང་གྲྭ་ཚང་; Wylie: gzhung grwa-tshang; "Central Monastic Body") and a civil servant who serves as the secretary, also serving on the committee. Under the 2008 Constitution, it is mandated that the Zhung Dratshang and rabdeys (monastic bodies in dzongs other than Punakha and Thimphu) receive state funding and facilities adequate to support the Drukpa Kagyu sect.

The Five Lopons are also responsible for appointing the Je Khenpo. They recommend a learned and respected monk ordained in accordance with the Druk-lu who possesses the nine qualities of a spiritual master, and is accomplished in ked-dzog (spiritual development and completion), to the King of Bhutan. The King then appoints that monk to the office of Je Khenpo and in turn, the Lopons are appointed on the same criteria by the Je Khenpo on the advice of the remaining members of the Dratshang Lhentshog.

The sitting Je Khenpo is the formal leader of the southern branch of the Drukpa Kagyu sect, which is part of the Kagyu tradition of Himalayan Buddhism. The primary duty of the Je Khenpo is to lead the Dratshang Lhentshog and to arbitrate on matters of doctrine, assisted by the Five Lopons. The Je Khenpo is also responsible for many important liturgical and religious duties across the country. Aside from the King of Bhutan, only the Je Khenpo may don a saffron kabney.

== See also ==
- Je Khenpo
- Constitution of Bhutan
- Politics of Bhutan
- Buddhism in Bhutan
- Religion in Bhutan
- Serlung Monastery
