= Tharpaling Monastery =

Buddhist monastery in Bumthang, Bhutan

Religion
- Affiliation: Tibetan Buddhism

Location
- Location: Bumthang District
- Country: Bhutan
- Interactive map of Tharpaling Monastery

Tharpaling Monastery is a Buddhist monastery in Bumthang, Bhutan. The Goemba is not only popular for the “Great Cannon of Tharpaling” but also for the Tharpaling Thongdrol festival. It is observed on the 15th day of the first month of the Bhutanese calendar.
