= Je Khenpo =

Leader of the Buddhist faith in Bhutan

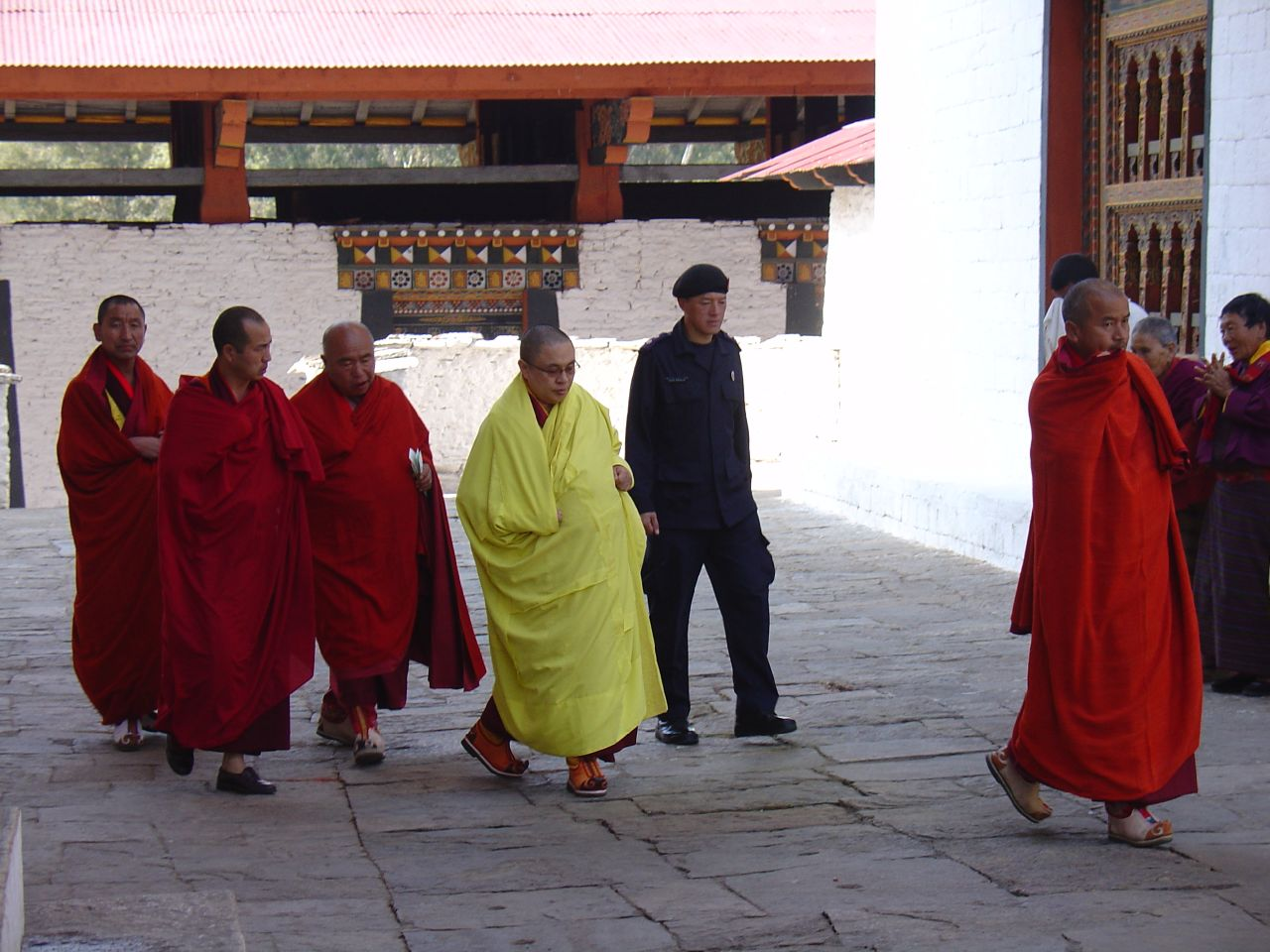
The Je Khenpo in 2008, at Punakha Dzong, in a saffron kabney

The Je Khenpo (Tibetan: རྗེ་མཁན་པོ་, Wylie: Rje Mkhan-po; "The Chief Abbot of the Central Monastic Body of Bhutan"), formerly called the Dharma Raja by orientalists, is the title given to the senior religious hierarch of Bhutan. His primary duty is to lead the Dratshang Lhentshog (Commission for the Monastic Affairs) of Bhutan, which oversees the Central Monastic Body, and to arbitrate on matters of doctrine, assisted by five Lopen Rinpoches (learned masters). The Je Khenpo is also responsible for many important liturgical and religious duties nationwide. The sitting Je Khenpo is also formally the leader of the southern branch of the Drukpa Kagyu sect, which is part of the Kagyu tradition of Tibetan Buddhism. Aside from the King of Bhutan, only the Je Khenpo may don a saffron kabney.

== History ==
According to the dual system of government established by Ngawang Namgyal in the 17th century, the powers of the government of Bhutan were ideally split between the religious branch, headed by the Je Khenpo, and the administrative branch, headed by the Druk Desi. The position of Je Khenpo was granted on merit by-election, and typically was given to the most respected monk in the Dratshang Lhentshog (Commission for the Monastic Affairs). Thus, unlike reincarnation lineages such as the Dalai Lama, Zhabdrung Rinpoche, or Panchen Lama, the position of Je Khenpo was never held by a child but always by a seasoned monk.

Historically, the role of the Je Khenpo was quite powerful. The Je Khenpo and Druk Desi collaborated to disempower the office of the Zhabdrung by finding multiple incarnations of various aspects of the Zhabdrung; both the Je Khenpo and the Druk Desi wanted to retain the power they had accrued through the dual system of government. However, since the establishment of the monarchy in 1907, the relative influence of the Je Khenpo has diminished. Nonetheless, the position remains powerful, and Je Khenpo is typically viewed as the closest and most powerful advisor to the King of Bhutan.

The 67th Je Khenpo, Ngawang Thinley Lhundup, died at age 84 on 10 June 2005. He was noted as a strict disciplinarian who would not compromise any rules in managing the Central Monastic Body. In addition to his position as Je Khenpo, he was recognized as the tulku of Nyizergang, the seat of the tertön Woogpa Lingpa in Wangdue Phodrang Province.

The 70th and present Je Khenpo is Tulku Jigme Chhoeda. He is believed to be the reincarnation of Maitreya and the mahasiddha Saraha, Hungchen Kara, Kheuchung Lotsawa, and Pema Tsering.

In 2008, the office of the Je Khenpo was codified as part of the Constitution of Bhutan. Under Article 3 Section 4, the King appoints the Je Khenpo as the spiritual leader of Bhutan on the recommendation of the Five Lopons. In turn, the Je Khenpo appoints, on the recommendation of the Dratshang Lhentshog (Commission for the Monastic Affairs), monks with the nine qualities of a spiritual master and accomplished in ked-dzog (stages of development and completion in Vajrayana practice) as the Five Lopons.

The residences of the Je Khenpo and the Central Monastic Body are:

- Winter residence: Punakha Dzong.
- Summer residence: Tashichho Dzong.

== List of Je Khenpos ==
=== 17th century ===
Number	Name	Tenure
1	Pekar Jungney	1651–1672
2	Sonam Ozer	1672–1689
3	Pekar Lhundrup	1689–1697
4	Damcho Pekar	1697–1707

=== 18th century ===
Number	Name	Tenure
5	Zodpa Thinley	1707–1724
6	Ngawang Lhundrup	1724–1730
7	Ngawang Thinley	1730–1738
8	Tenzin Norbu	1738–1744
9	Shakya Rinchen	1744–1755
10	Tenzin Chogyal	1755–1762
11	Ngawang Thinley	1762–1769
12	Kunga Jamtsho	1769–1771
13	Yonten Thaye	1771–1775
14	Tenzin Namgyal	1775–1781
15	Kunzang Gyaltsen	1781–1784
16	Sherab Singye	1784–1791
17	Jamgön Yeshi Dorji	1791–1797
18	Jamyang Gyaltshen	1797–1803

=== 19th century ===
Number	Name	Tenure
19	Ngawang Chögyal	1803–1807
20	Yeshey Gyaltshen	1807–1811
21	Jampyel Drakpa	1811–1816
22	Jigme Gyaltsen	1816–1826
23	Jampyel Drakpa	1826–1831
24	Shakya Gyaltsen	1831–1836
25	Sherab Gyaltsen	1836–1839
26	Yönten Jamtsho	1839–1840
27	Pema Zangpo	1840–1847
28	Rinchen Zangpo	1847–1848
29	Pema Zangpo	1848–1850
30	Jampyel Jamtsho	1850–1851
31	Yönten Gyaltsen	1851–1858
32	Tshultrim Gyaltsen	1858–1860
33	Künga Peljor	1860–1861
34	Shedrup Ozer	1861–1865
35	Shakya Gyaltsen	1865–1869
36	Yönten Pelzang	1869–1873
37	Künga Singye	1873–1875
38	Shākya Gyaltsen	1875–1875
39	Lodrö Gyaltsen	1875–1878
40	Pekar Ozer	1878–1881
41	Ngawang Dönden	1881–1886
42	Thinley Gyaltsen	1886–1888
43	Tenzin Lhündrup	1888–1889
44	Thinley Gyaltsen	1889–1891
45	Thinley Jamtsho	1891–1894
46	Damchö Gyaltsen	1894–1899
47	Sherab Lhündrup	1899–1901

=== 20th century ===
Number	Name	Tenure
48	Jamyang Rinchen	1901–1903
49	Rigzin Nyingpo	1903–1907
50	Jampyel Shenyen	1907–1909
51	Jampai Tobzang	1909–1912
52	Pelden Singye	1912–1915
53	Yeshey Ngödrup	1915–1917
54	Yeshey Dawa	1917–1918
55	Pelden Singye	1918–1918
56	Mipham Wangpo	1919–1922
57	Ngawang Gyaltsen	1922–1927
58	Sidzhe Namgyal	1927–1931
59	Chökyi Wangchuk	1931–1940
60	Ngawang Thinley	1940–1946
61	Samten Jamtsho	1946–1955
62	Yönten Tsündu	1955–1956
63	Thinley Lhündrup	1956–1961
64	Samten Pelzang	1961–1965
65	Yeshey Singye	1965–1968
66	Yönten Tarchen	1968–1971
67	Nyizer Thinley Lhendrup	1971–1986
68	Je Thrizur Tenzin Doendrup	1986–1990
69	Geshey Gendün Rinchen	1990–1996
70	Trulku Jigme Chhoeda	1996 – present

=== 21st century ===
Number	Name	Tenure
70	Trulku Jigme Chhoeda	1996 – present

== See also ==
- Buddhism in Bhutan
- Constitution of Bhutan
- Dual system of government
- Khenpo
