= Tibetan dual system of government =

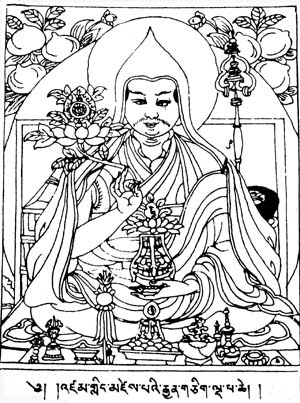
The Fifth Dalai Lama implemented the traditional Cho-sid-nyi (dual system) in Tibet.

The Dual System of Government is the traditional diarchal political system of Tibetan peoples whereby the Desi (temporal ruler) coexists with the spiritual authority of the realm, usually unified under a third single ruler. The actual distribution of power between institutions varied over time and location. The Tibetan term Cho-sid-nyi (Tibetan: ཆོས་སྲིད་གཉིས་, Wylie: chos-srid-gnyis; alternate spellings include Chhos-srid-gnyis, Chhoe-sid-nyi, and Chos-sid-nyi) literally means "both Dharma and temporal", but may also be translated as "dual system of religion and politics."

Because the ultimate ruler is the patron and protector of state religion, some aspects of the dual system of government may be likened to the Supreme Governance of the Church of England, or even to theocracy. However, other aspects resemble secularism, aiming to separate the doctrines of religion and politics. Under the Cho-sid-nyi, both religious and temporal authorities wield actual political power, albeit within officially separate institutions. Religious and secular officials might work side by side, each responsible to different bureaucracies.

== History ==
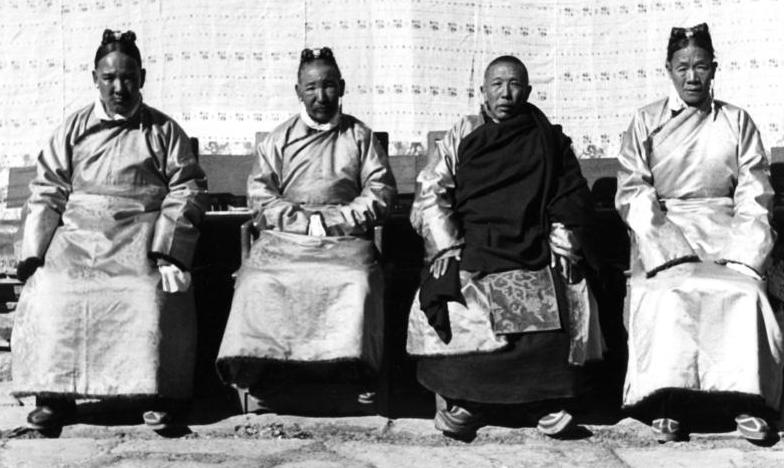
The Tibetan Kashag in 1938–39. From 1751 to 1951, the Kashag replaced the office of Desi in the Cho-sid-nyi (dual system) of Tibet

Since at least the period of the Mongol presence in Tibet during the 13th and 14th centuries, Buddhist and Bön clerics had participated in secular government, having the same rights as laymen to be appointed state officials, both military and civil. This system stood in stark contrast with that of China, in which the Buddhist view of politics as a "dismal science" as well as the Confucian monopoly on the bureaucracy precluded such political activity by the Sangha. By the Ming dynasty (founded 1368), the Sakya held office above the heads of both components, embodying a government of both chos and srid. As a result, there were two sets of laws and officials, the religious (Tibetan: ལྷ་སདེ་, Wylie: lha-sde) and the temporal (Tibetan: མི་སྡེ་, Wylie: mi-sde), however the branches shared the government and did not operate exclusively of each other. This system often operated under Mongol and Chinese overlordship with the respective emperor above the local Tibetan administration.

The Tibetan form of government from 1642 until 1951 was the Cho-sid-nyi. The dual system was implemented during a period of consolidation under the Fifth Dalai Lama (r. 1642–1682), who unified Tibet religiously and politically after a prolonged civil war. He brought the government of Tibet under the control of the Gelug school of Tibetan Buddhism after defeating the rival Kagyu and Jonang sects and the secular ruler, the Tsangpa prince. The Tibetan model sought to produce a synthesis of the complementary components of the mundane norm: Dharma (Tibetan: ཆོས་ལུགས་, Wylie: chos-lugs) and Samsara (Tibetan: འཇིག་རྟེན་, Wylie: 'jig-rten). One basic assumption of this system is that the temporal lord depended on religion for legitimacy, while the institution of state religion depended on patronage and protection from the political élite.

In 1751, the Seventh Dalai Lama abolished the post of Desi (or Regent), in whom too much power had been placed. The Desi was replaced by the Kashag (Council) to represent the civil administration. The Dalai Lama thus became the spiritual and political leader of Tibet.

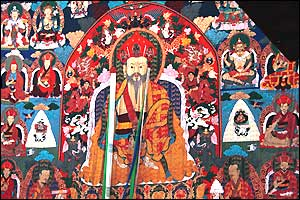
Shabdrung Ngawang Namgyal instituted the Tibetan Cho-sid-nyi (dual system) in Bhutan

In Bhutan, the Cho-sid-nyi was established by Zhabdrung Ngawang Namgyal in the 17th century (1651) under the code known as the Tsa Yig. Having fled sectarian persecution in Tibet, Ngawang Namgyal established the Drukpa Lineage as the state religion. Under the Bhutanese system, the powers of the government were split between the religious branch headed by the Je Khenpo of the Drukpa Lineage and the civil administrative branch headed by the Druk Desi. Both the Je Khenpo and Druk Desi were under the nominal authority of the Shabdrung, a reincarnation of Ngawang Namgyal. After the death of Shabdrung Ngawang Namgyal, Bhutan nominally followed the dual system of government. In practice, the Shabdrung was often a child under the control of the Druk Desi, and regional penlops (governors) often administered their districts in defiance of the Druk Desi until the rise of the unified monarchy at the beginning of the 20th century.

In Ladakh and Sikkim, two related Chogyal dynasties reigned with absolute control, punctuated by periods of invasion and colonization by Tibet, Bhutan, India, Nepal, and the British Empire. The basis of the Chogyal monarchy in both Ladakh and Sikkim was its recognition by Three Lamas, and the title Chogyal (Tibetan: ཆོས་རྒྱལ་, Wylie: chos-rgyal; "Dharma Raja" or "Religious King") itself refers to the dual system of government. Ladakh's Namgyal dynasty lasted from 1470 until 1834. The autonomy of the Tibetan élite in Ladakh, as well as their system of government, ended with the campaigns of General Zorawar Singh and Rajput suzerainty. Ladakh became a region within the Indian state of Jammu and Kashmir until 2019, when it was formed into a separate union territory. The Namgyal dynasty continued in Sikkim from 1542 until 1975, when the kingdom voted by plebiscite to join the union of India.

== Contemporary systems ==
=== Kingdom of Bhutan ===
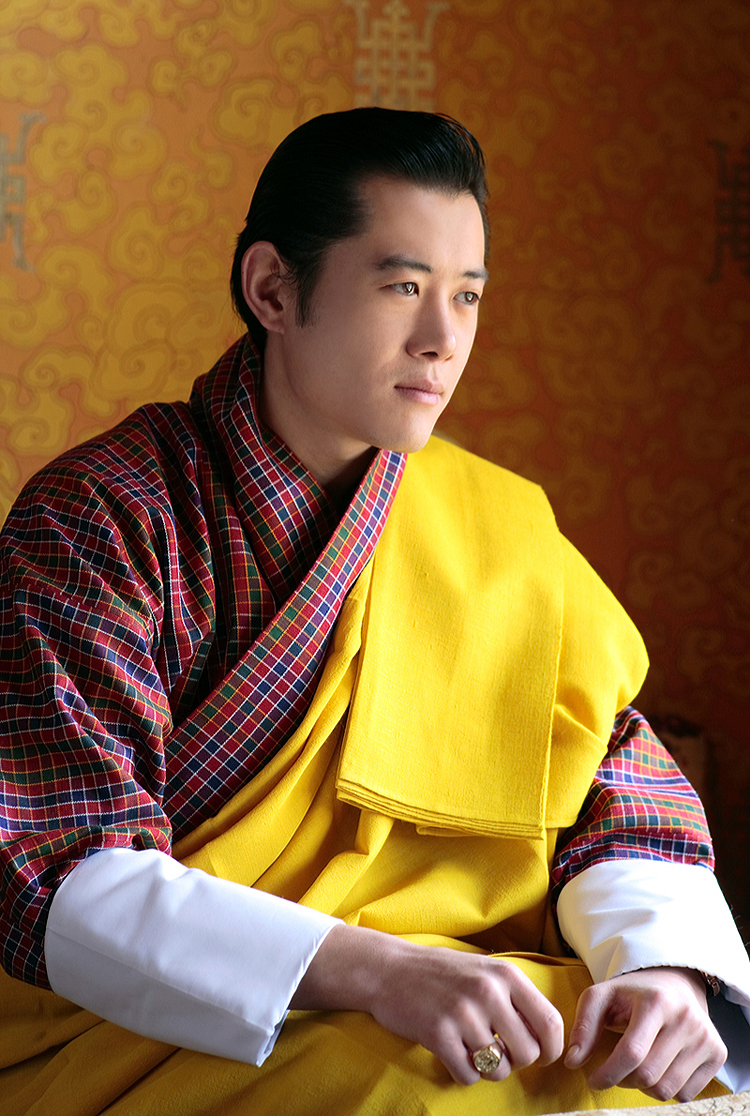
The Bhutanese Druk Gyalpo Jigme Khesar Namgyel Wangchuck is the embodiment of the Cho-sid-nyi under the Constitution of Bhutan

The only modern example of a sovereign government operating under the Cho-sid-nyi is Bhutan, although it exists in a highly modified form. In 1907, in an effort to reform the dysfunctional political system, the penlops (governors) of Bhutan orchestrated the establishment of a Bhutanese monarchy with Ugyen Wangchuck, the penlop of Trongsa installed as hereditary king, with the support of Britain and against the wishes of Tibet. Since the establishment of the Wangchuck dynasty in 1907, the office of the Druk Desi has been held by the reigning Druk Gyalpo (King of Bhutan). Under the monarchy, the relative influence of the Je Khenpo has diminished. Nonetheless, the position remains a powerful one and the Je Khenpo is typically viewed as the closest and most powerful advisor to the Druk Gyalpo.

The office of Shabdrung has fared less well, and has been subsumed by the office of the Druk Gyalpo. The royal family suffered from questions of legitimacy in its early years, with the reincarnations of the various Shabdrungs posing a threat. According to one Drukpa source, the Shabdrung's brother Chhoki Gyeltshen challenged the 1926 accession of King Jigme Wangchuck. He was rumored to have met with Mahatma Gandhi to garner support for the Shabdrung against the King. The Seventh Shabdrung, Jigme Dorji was then "retired" to Talo monastery and died in 1931, under rumors of assassination. He was the last Shabdrung recognized by Bhutan; subsequent claimants to the incarnation have not been recognized by the government. In 1962, Jigme Ngawang Namgyal, known as Shabdrung Rimpoche to his followers, fled Bhutan for India where he spent the remainder of his life. Until 2002, Bhutanese pilgrims were able to journey to Kalimpong, just south of Bhutan, to visit with the Master. On April 5, 2003, the Shabdrung died. Some of his followers claim he was poisoned, while Kuensel took pains to explain he died after an extended bout with cancer. In early 2007, reports alleged that the current Shabdrung Pema Namgyel, then a small child, had been held under house arrest in Bhutan along with his parents since 2005 after being invited to Bhutan from his home in India.

The Constitution of Bhutan, enacted in 2008, confirms Bhutan's commitment to the Cho-sid-nyi system. However the title "Druk Desi" never appears in the Constitution, and all administrative powers are vested in the Druk Gyalpo and civilian offices directly. Furthermore, the Druk Gyalpo appoints the Je Khenpo on advice of the Five Lopons, and the democratic Constitution itself is the supreme law of the land, as opposed to a Shabdrung figurehead. In the 2008 Constitution, there is no reference whatsoever to the office of Shabdrung.

=== Government of Tibet in exile ===
The Parliament of the Tibetan government in exile consists of 43–46 members including 10 religious delegates (2 members each from the four schools of Tibetan Buddhism and the traditional Bön school). Aside from seats reserved for religious representatives, offices are generally open to clerics: the Prime Minister of its Parliament is Lobsang Tenzin, a Buddhist monk. The administration of the government in exile was headed for decades by the Dalai Lama, but in 2011, he ceded his temporal (secular) powers, keeping only his role as spiritual leader.

== See also ==
- Politics of Bhutan
- History of Bhutan
- History of Tibet
- History of Sikkim
- History of Ladakh
