= List of magazines in China =

In 1898 the first women's magazine was published in China. The number of women's magazines has increased in the country since the late 1980s. In addition to national titles international magazines are also published in the country. Madame Figaro, and Elle are among such titles both of which entered into the Chinese market in 1988. In 1998 Cosmopolitan began to be circulated in the country. Esquire is the first international men's magazine which entered the Chinese magazine market in 1999. From the 2000s several Japanese magazines began to be circulated in Chinese language in the country, including CanCam.

Total number of magazines in China was 8,889 in 2001 when China became a member of the World Trade Organization (WTO). Following the accession of China to the WTO advertising revenues of the magazines significantly increased. The number of foreign consumer magazines was sixty-nine in 2009.

The following is an incomplete list of current and defunct magazines published in China. They are published in Chinese or other languages.

== A ==
- Asia Literary Review
- Asian Private Banker

== B ==
- BeijingKids
- Beijing Review
- Beijing This Month
- The Beijinger
- Bosom Friend

== C ==
- Caijing
- Cawaii!
- China Business Network Weekly
- China Computer Education
- China Pictorial
- China Plastic & Rubber Journal
- China Policy Review
- China Today
- Chinese Literature
- Chinese National Geography
- Chinese Recorder and Missionary Journal
- The Chinese Repository
- City Weekend
- Contemporary Review
- Creation Quarterly
- The Culture Arts Review

== D ==
- Diànzǐ Yóuxì Ruǎnjiàn
- Dushu
- Duzhe

== E ==
- Emancipation Pictorial (Jiěfàng Huàbào)
- Eyebrow Talk (Méiyǔ)

== F ==
- Fiction Monthly
- Freezing Point
- Funü shibao
- Funü zazhi

== G ==
- Gafencu Men
- Gushi Hui
- Global Sources Magazines

== H ==
- Hongqi

== J ==
- Jintian

== L ==
- Ling Long
- L'Officiel China
- The Young Companion

== M ==
- Metallurgy Analysis
- Modern Sketch
- More Hangzhou

== N ==
- New Youth
- Nubao
- Numéro
- Nüzi shijie

== O ==
- The Outlook Magazine

== P ==
- Painkiller
- Party
- People's Literature
- Play

== Q ==
- Qiushi

== R ==
- Ray Li
- Renditions

== S ==
- Sanlian Lifeweek
- Science Fiction World
- Shanghai Business Review
- Shanghai Manhua
- Shanghai Review of Books
- Shijie zhishi
- Shishang xiansheng
- Shiyue
- South Reviews
- Star Girls

== T ==
- Tattler
- Tbjhome
- That's Beijing
- That's PRD
- That's Shanghai
- Tian Feng
- The Tiger
- The Traveler
- The True Record
- The Twenty-First Century
- Typhoon Club

== V ==
- Vestnik Manʹchzhurii
- Vogue China

== W ==
- The West China Missionary News
- Wings of China
- Women's Lives
- The World of Chinese

== X ==
- Xinmin Weekly
- Xueren

== Y ==
- Yanhuang Chunqiu
- The Young Companion
- Youth Film Handbook

== See also ==
- List of newspapers in China
