= Guangzhou Daily =

Chinese Communist Party newspaper

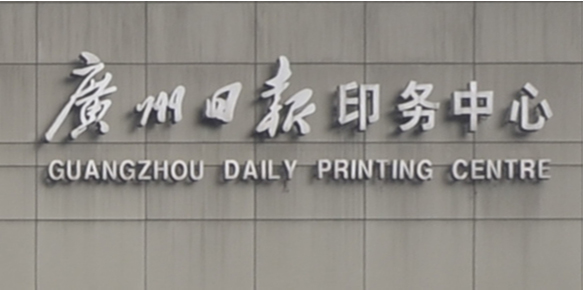
- Native name: 广州日报
- Type: Daily newspaper
- Format: Print, online
- Owner: Guangzhou Daily Newspaper Group
- Publisher: Guangzhou Daily Agency
- Founded: December 1, 1952
- Political alignment: Chinese Communist Party
- Language: Chinese
- Website: gzdaily.dayoo.com

Guangzhou Daily
- Traditional Chinese: 廣州日报
- Simplified Chinese: 广州日報
Transcriptions
Standard Mandarin
- Hanyu Pinyin: Guǎngzhōu Rìbào
Yue: Cantonese
- Jyutping: gwong2 zau1 jat6 bou3

Guangzhou Daily or Guangzhou Ribao (simplified Chinese: 广州日报; traditional Chinese: 廣州日報; pinyin: Guǎngzhōu Rìbào; Jyutping: gwong2 zau1 jat6 bou3), also known as Canton Daily, is the official newspaper of the Guangzhou Municipal Committee of the Chinese Communist Party. Established on December 1, 1952, the newspaper is owned by the Guangzhou Daily Newspaper Group (广州日报报业集团), which also runs other newspapers and magazines such as China Business News (第一财经日报) and South Reviews (南风窗).

Guangzhou Daily, published the Guangzhou Daily Agency, has been closed three times and resumed three times, the last resumption was on February 26, 1972, when it was resumed as Guangzhou Post (广州报).

In December 2024, the Guangzhou Daily Newspaper Group, in concert with the Publicity Department of the Guangzhou municipal committee of the CCP, local representatives of the United Front Work Department, and five universities formed an in-house international communication center.
