= Qiu Yufang =

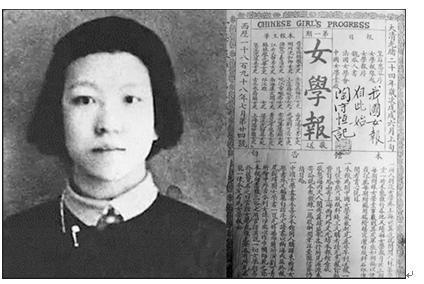
Qiu Yufang

Qiu Yufang (裘毓芳) (1871–1904), courtesy name Meilu (梅侣), was a Chinese journalist and feminist, born in Wuxi (無錫), Jiangsu province, China. She is regarded as the first female journalist in China. A member of a progressive scholarly family, she started the paper Wuxi baihua bao (無錫白話報) with her uncle, Qiu Tingliang (裘廷梁), in 1898, where she became its leading editor and columnist. The same year, she also became employed at the first women's paper in China, the Nubao (女學報) in Shanghai. She supported Western reforms in China, both in business, literature and education for women.
