= Qin Shuo =

Chinese journalist and media executive

- 秦朔
- Born: 1968 (age 57–58); Shenqiu County, Henan, China
- Education: Fudan University; California State University, Northridge; Sun Yat-sen University
- Occupations: Journalist, media executive
- Years active: 1990–present
- Known for: Founding and leading China Business News; founder of Qin Shuo's Circle of Friends

Qin Shuo (Chinese: 秦朔, romanized: Qín Shuò) is a Chinese journalist and former newspaper editor.

== Early life and education ==
Qin was born in Shenqiu County, Henan, People's Republic of China. He is a member of the Chinese Communist Party. He graduated from the Department of Journalism at the Fudan University School of Journalism in July 1990.

In 2000, Qin studied at California State University, Northridge, where he obtained a Master of Public Administration degree. In September 2001, he began part-time doctoral studies at Sun Yat-sen University, focusing on Chinese marketing and consumer behavior. His doctoral research was associated with the fields of journalism and media studies.

== Career ==
After graduating from Fudan University, Qin joined South Reviews as an editor and reporter. In 1997, he became the magazine's editor-in-chief.

In 2003, Qin publicly argued against excessive emphasis on gross domestic product (GDP) growth. His article Mr. GDP's Narrative was later included in a graduate-level macroeconomics textbook published by People's University of China Press (Renmin University of China Press).

In 2004, he participated in the founding of China Business News and became its editor-in-chief. He also served as general manager of China Business Network Co., Ltd., a subsidiary of Shanghai Media Group.

In June 2015, Qin resigned from China Business News. On 16 October 2015, he launched a self-published media platform, Qin Shuo's Circle of Friends, a form of personal media focusing on economics, business, and public affairs. The platform publishes content in the context of China's digital media ecosystem and emerging social media landscape.
