= Lute Platform =

Coordinates: 30.562°N 114.258°E

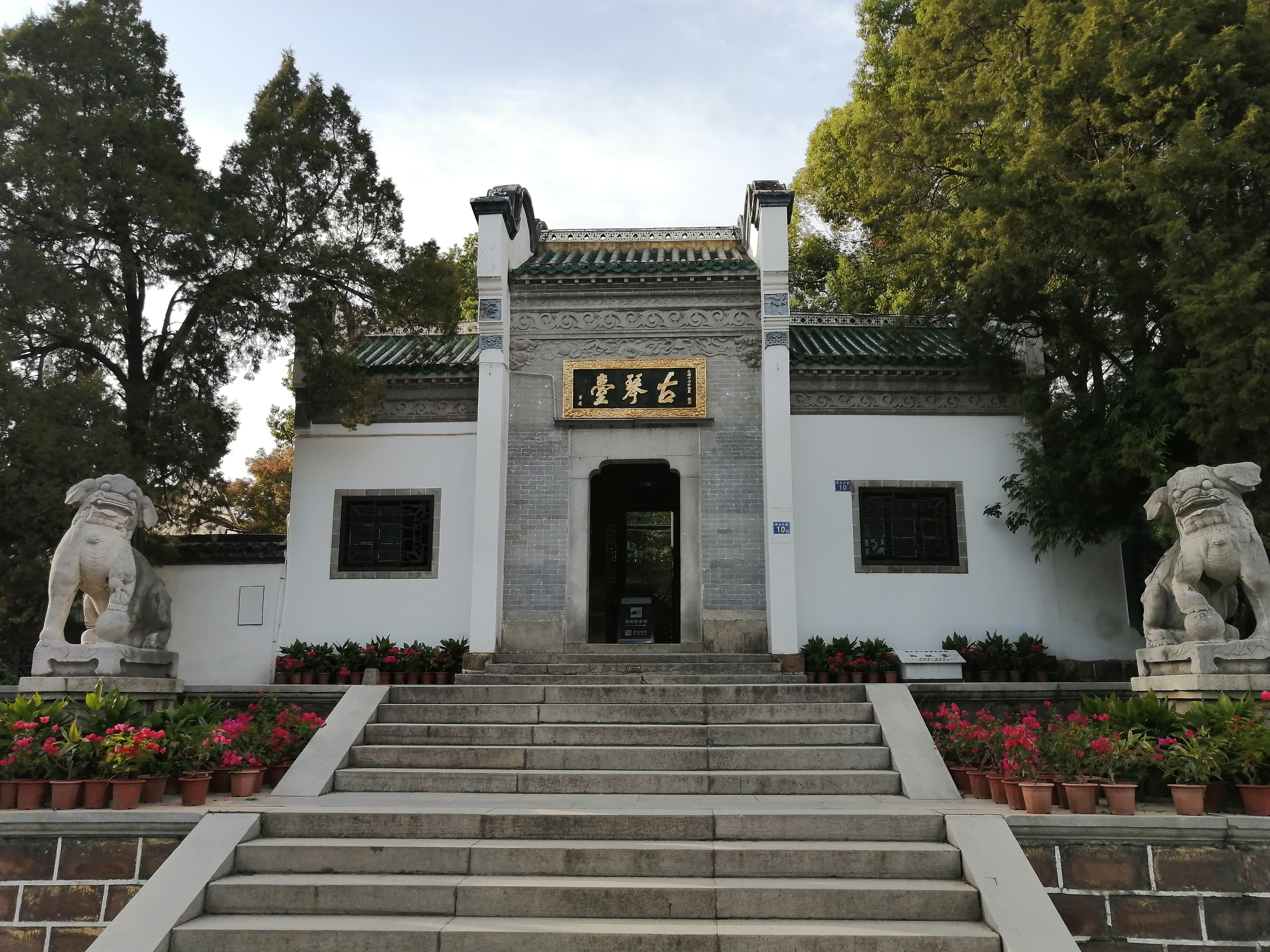

Lute Platform (琴台, Qín Tái) is a memorial site located between Guishan and Moon Lake on the southern bank of the Hanshui in Hanyang, Wuhan, Hubei near the Qintai subway station on Line 6, Wuhan Metro and has been listed as a Key Cultural Heritage Site of Hubei Province. It is dedicated to the well-known Chinese story of Yu Boya and Zhong Ziqi, the events of which are said to have taken place during the Zhou dynasty in the vicinity of Lute Platform.

First erected in the Song dynasty, Lute Platform has been destroyed and rebuilt numerous times, and was rebuilt again during the 19th century. Scholars Wang Zhong and Huang Pengnian wrote about Lute Platform during the reconstruction work that was carried out in the Qing dynasty.

A musical performance competition has been held annually at Lute Platform since 2011.

== See also ==
Bosom Friend
