= Plastics industry =

Industrial sector

The plastics industry manufactures polymer materials—commonly called plastics—and offers services in plastics important to a range of industries, including packaging, building and construction, electronics, aerospace, manufacturing and transportation.

It is part of the chemical industry. In addition, as mineral oil is the major constituent of plastics, it therefore forms part of the petrochemical industry.

Besides plastics production, plastics engineering is an important part of the industrial sector. The latter field is dominated by engineering plastic as raw material because of its better mechanical and thermal properties than the more widely used commodity plastics.

== Markets ==
According to PlasticsEurope, the top three markets for plastics are packaging, building and construction, and automotive.

== Production ==
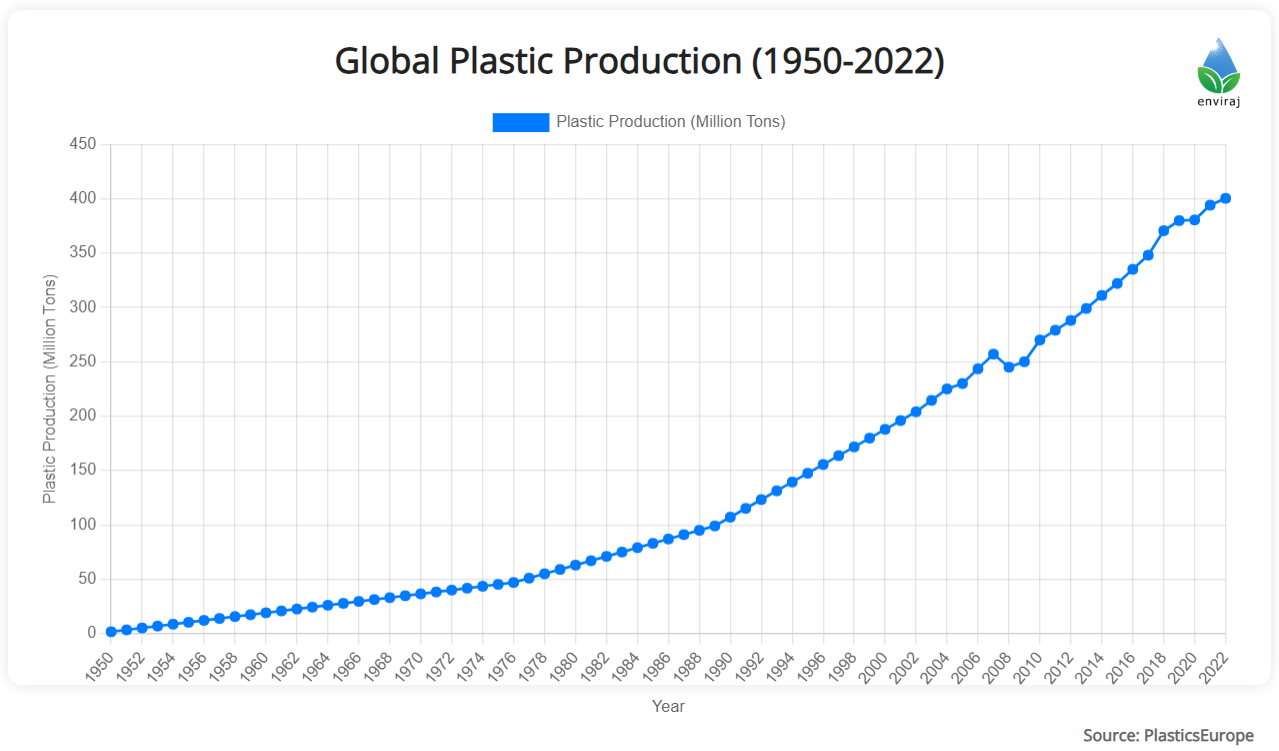
Global plastic production (1950–2022)

Plastics production has been growing globally. The numbers include thermoplastics and polyurethanes, as well as thermosets, adhesives, coatings, sealants, and PP-fibers. Data was gathered by PlasticsEurope (PEMRG) and Consultic, or the nova-institute.

World plastics production in Mt
year	Megatonnes
2002	204
2007	257
2009	250
2011	279
2012	288
2013	299
2018	370.5
2022	400.3

However, in 2020 the COVID-19 pandemic has had a devastating effect on the fossil fuel and petrochemical industry. Natural gas prices have dropped so low that gas producers were burning if off on-site (not being worth the cost to transport it to cracking facilities). In addition, bans on single-use consumer plastic (in China, the European Union, Canada, and many countries in Africa), and bans on plastic bags (in several states in the USA) has reduced demand for plastics considerably. Many cracking facilities in the USA have been suspended. The petrochemical industry has been trying to save itself by attempting to rapidly expand demand for plastic products worldwide (i.e. through pushbacks on plastic bans and by increasing the number of products wrapped in plastic in countries where plastic use is not already as widespread (i.e. developing nations)).

== History ==
- Alexander Crum Brown discovered the carbon double bond in ethylene
- James Swinburne, the Father of British Plastics, revolutionized the plastics industry in Europe.
- Leo Baekeland, who created the first plastic, Bakelite.
- Hermann Staudinger, who received the Nobel Prize for his discoveries of Macromolecules and Polymers, the chemical backbone of plastics.

== Associations ==
=== United States ===
- American Plastics Council (trade association)
- Society of the Plastics Industry
- American Chemistry Council

=== Europe ===
- European Polymer Federation (scientific)

=== United Kingdom ===
- British Plastics Federation (trade association)

=== India ===
- Plastindia

=== International ===
- International Association of Plastics Distributors
- Society of Plastics Engineers

== Countries and sites ==
- Beccles is a town in England which is a center of the plastics industry
- Erie, Pennsylvania is a center of the plastics industry in the United States
- Oyonnax is called Plastic Valley in France
- Stenungsund is a town in Sweden which is considered to be a centre for the plastic industry in Scandinavia

== Initiatives ==
- Plastics 2020 Challenge
- Plastics Free July

== Journals and conferences ==
- Plastics News
- Plastics News Global Group

== Trade Shows ==
- NPE – National Plastics Expo (USA)
- Chinaplas (China)
- K (Germany)
- Plastimagen (Mexico)
- Plastindia and Plastivision (India)
- Plastpol (Poland)
- Interplas (United Kingdom)
- Interplastica (Russia)

== See also ==
- Economics of plastics processing
- Plastic pollution
- Dedicated bio-based chemical
- Drop-in bioplastic
- Thermoplastic
