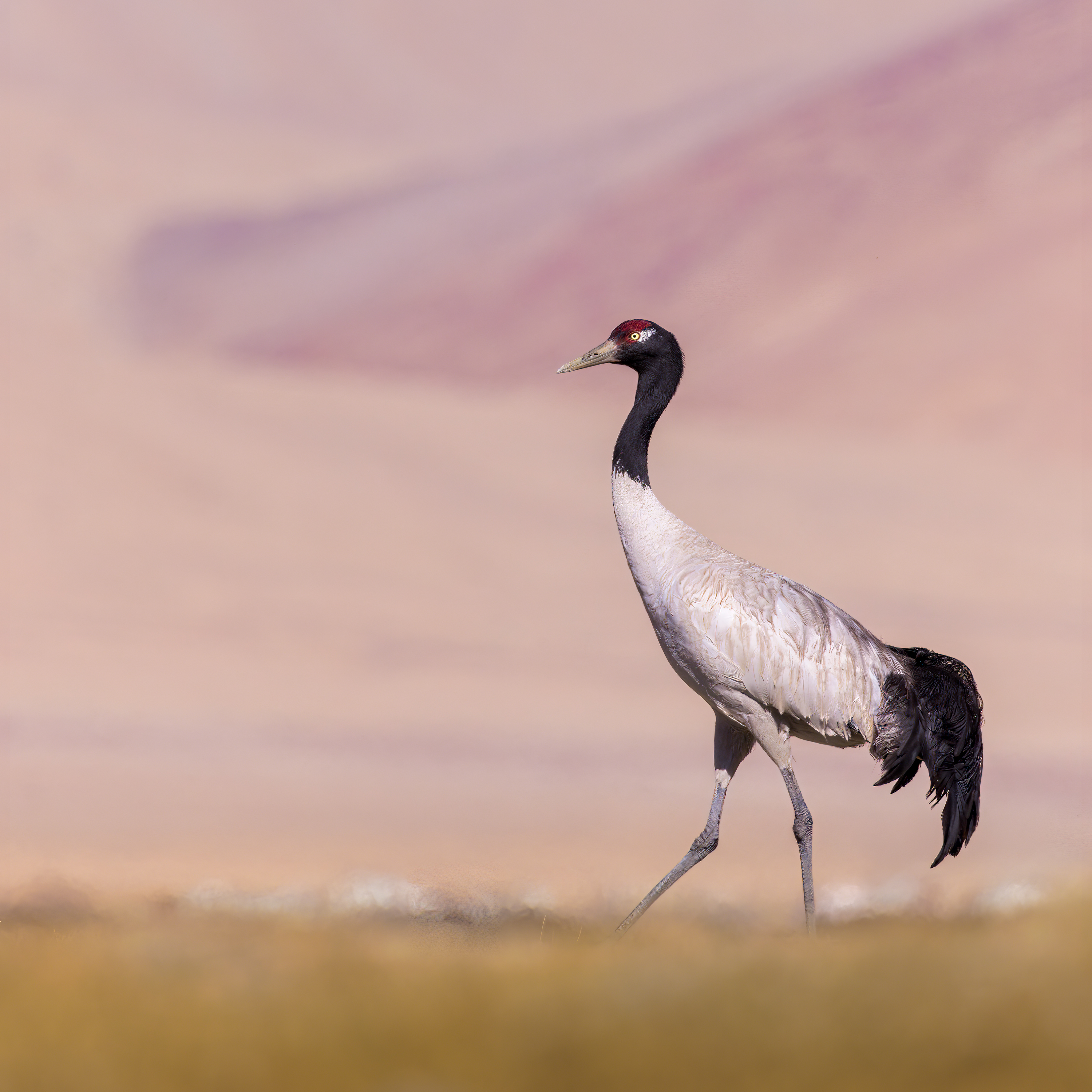
- In Ladakh

Conservation status
- Near Threatened (IUCN 3.1)
- CITES Appendix I

Scientific classification
- Kingdom: Animalia
- Phylum: Chordata
- Class: Aves
- Order: Gruiformes
- Family: Gruidae
- Genus: Grus
- Species: G. nigricollis

Binomial name
- Grus nigricollis Przhevalsky, 1876

= Black-necked crane =

Species of large bird from Asia

The black-necked crane (Grus nigricollis) is a medium-sized crane in Asia that breeds on the Tibetan Plateau and remote parts of India and Bhutan. It is 139 cm (55 in) long with a 235 cm (7.71 ft) wingspan, and it weighs 5.5 kg (12 lb). It is whitish-gray, with a black head, red crown patch, black upper neck and legs, and white patch to the rear of the eye. It has black primaries and secondaries. Both sexes are similar. Some populations are known to make seasonal movements. It is revered in Buddhist traditions and culturally protected across much of its range. A festival in Bhutan celebrates the bird while the Indian union territory of Ladakh has designated it as the state bird.

== Distribution and habitat ==
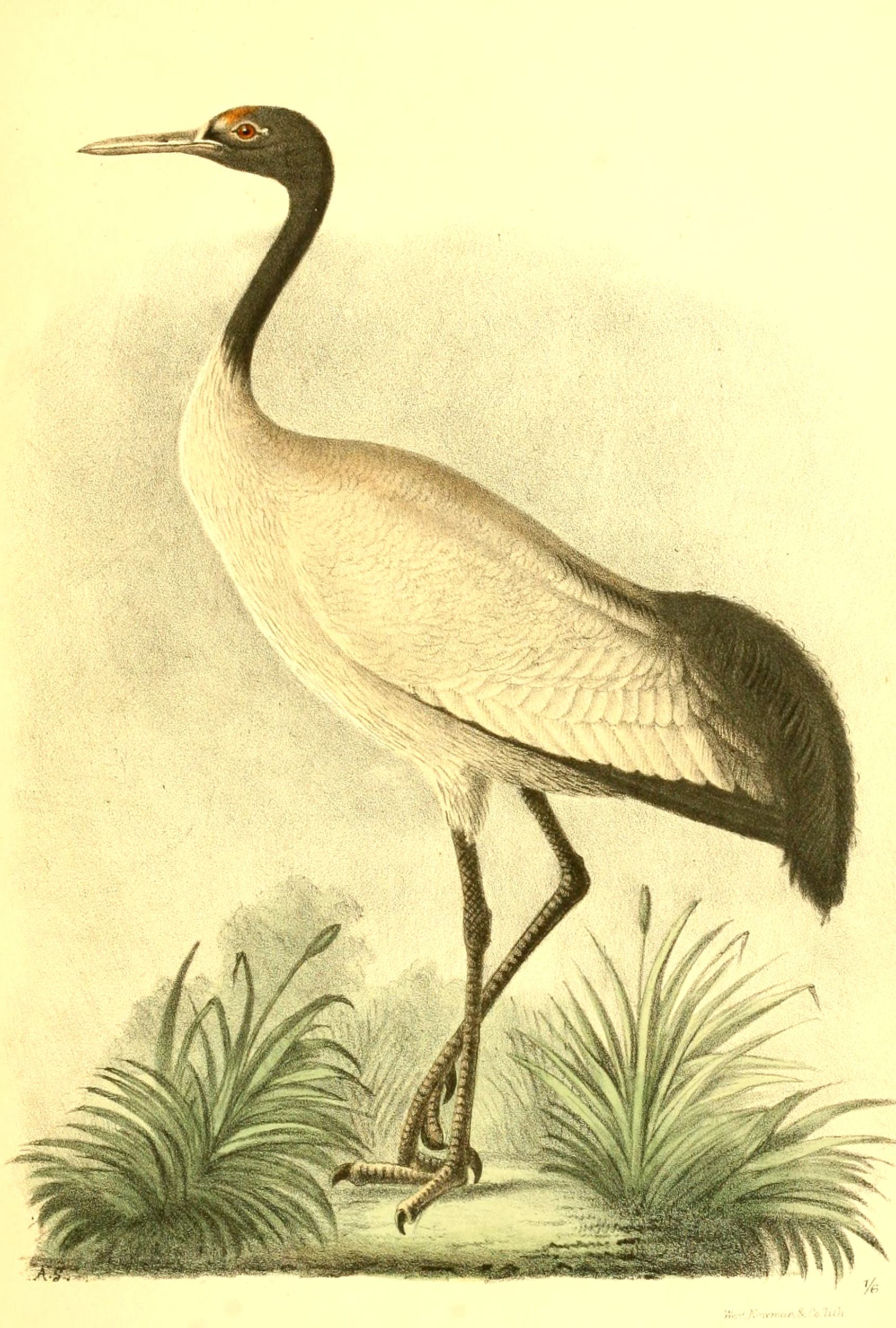
Copy of an illustration in Nikolai Przhevalsky's work where he gave the species its binomial name

The black-necked crane summers mainly in the high-altitude Tibetan Plateau. The breeding areas are alpine meadows, lakeside and riverine marshes and river valleys. They also make use of barley and wheat fields in these areas. Wintering areas tend to be in sheltered valleys or lower altitudes. The largest populations are in China with smaller numbers extending into Vietnam, Bhutan and India. Small populations have been noted in northern Sikkim. A small group of 20 to 40 was once known to regularly visit the Subansiri area in the Apa Tani valley until 1975, and vagrants have been recorded in Nepal.

== Description ==
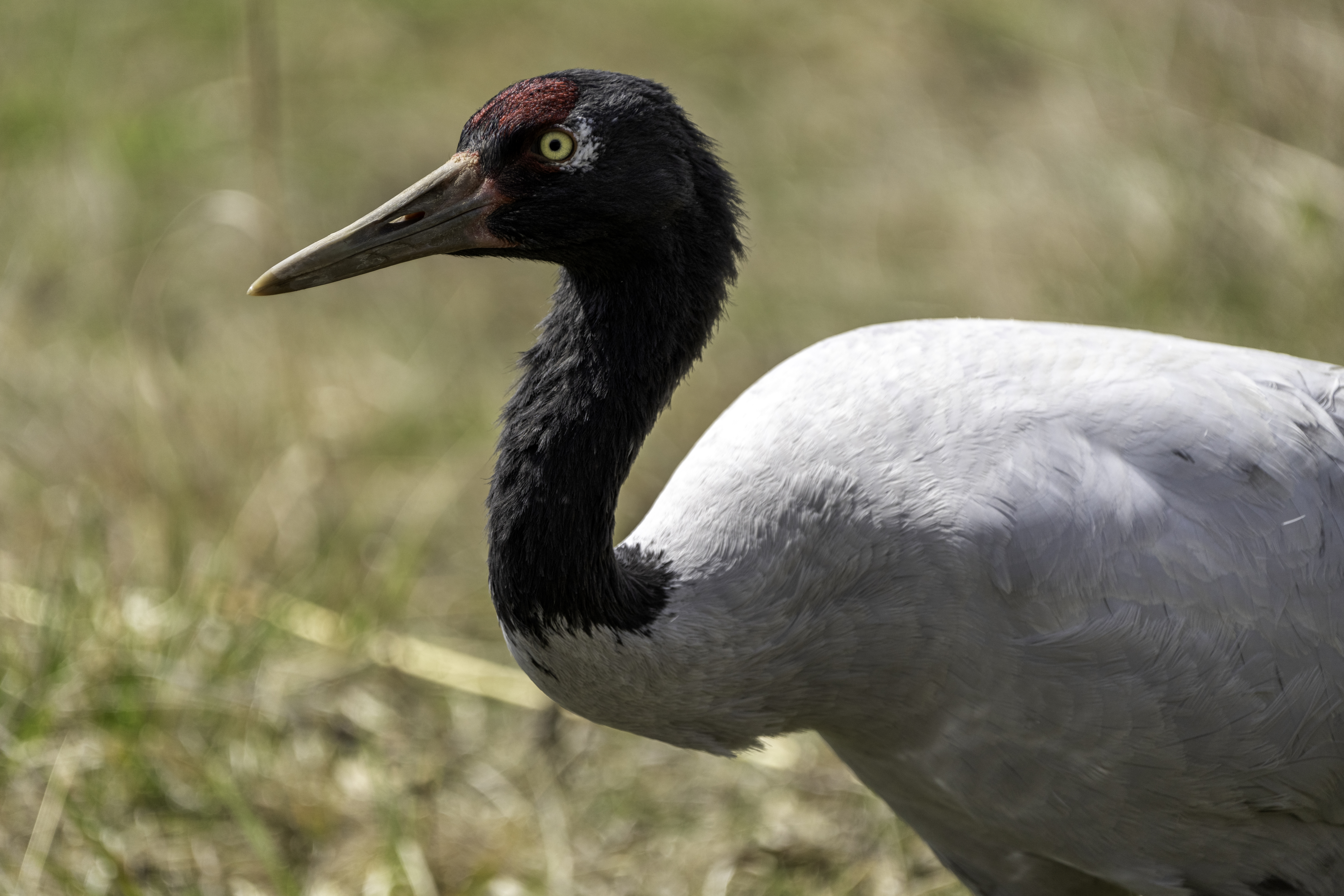
A black-necked crane at the International Crane Foundation

This medium-sized crane is mostly grey with a black head and neck. The lores and crown are naked and dull red. A small patch of white feathers are present below and behind the eye. The tail is black and makes it easy to distinguish at a distance from the similar looking common crane which has grey tail.

== Behaviour and ecology ==
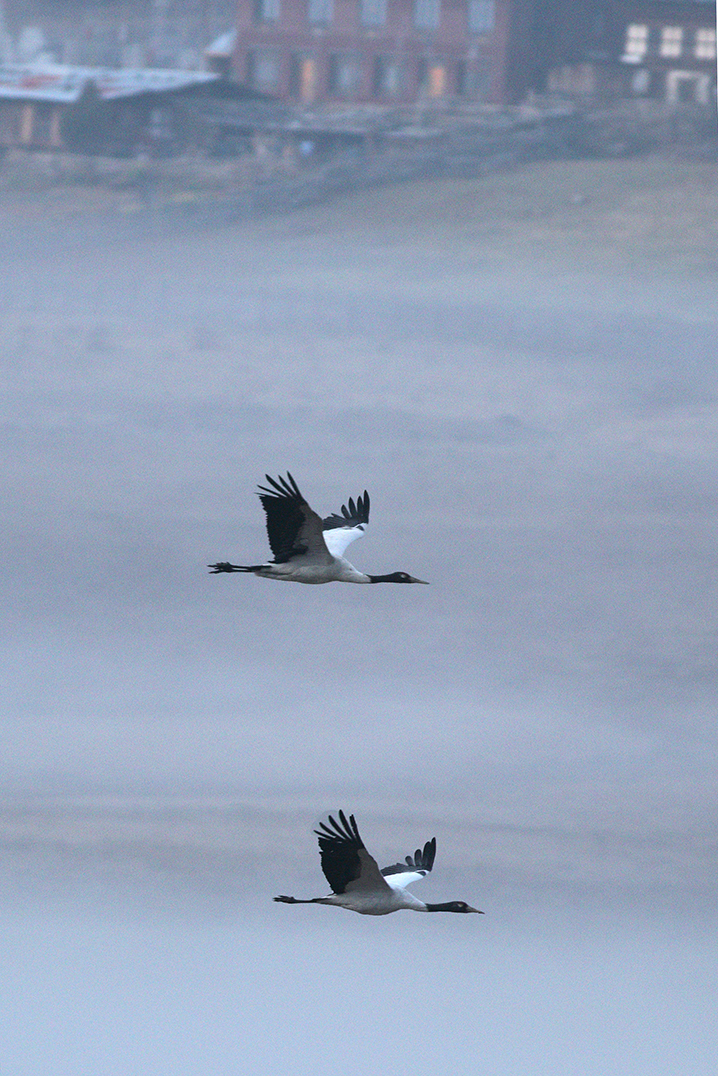
From Phobjikha Valley, Bhutan

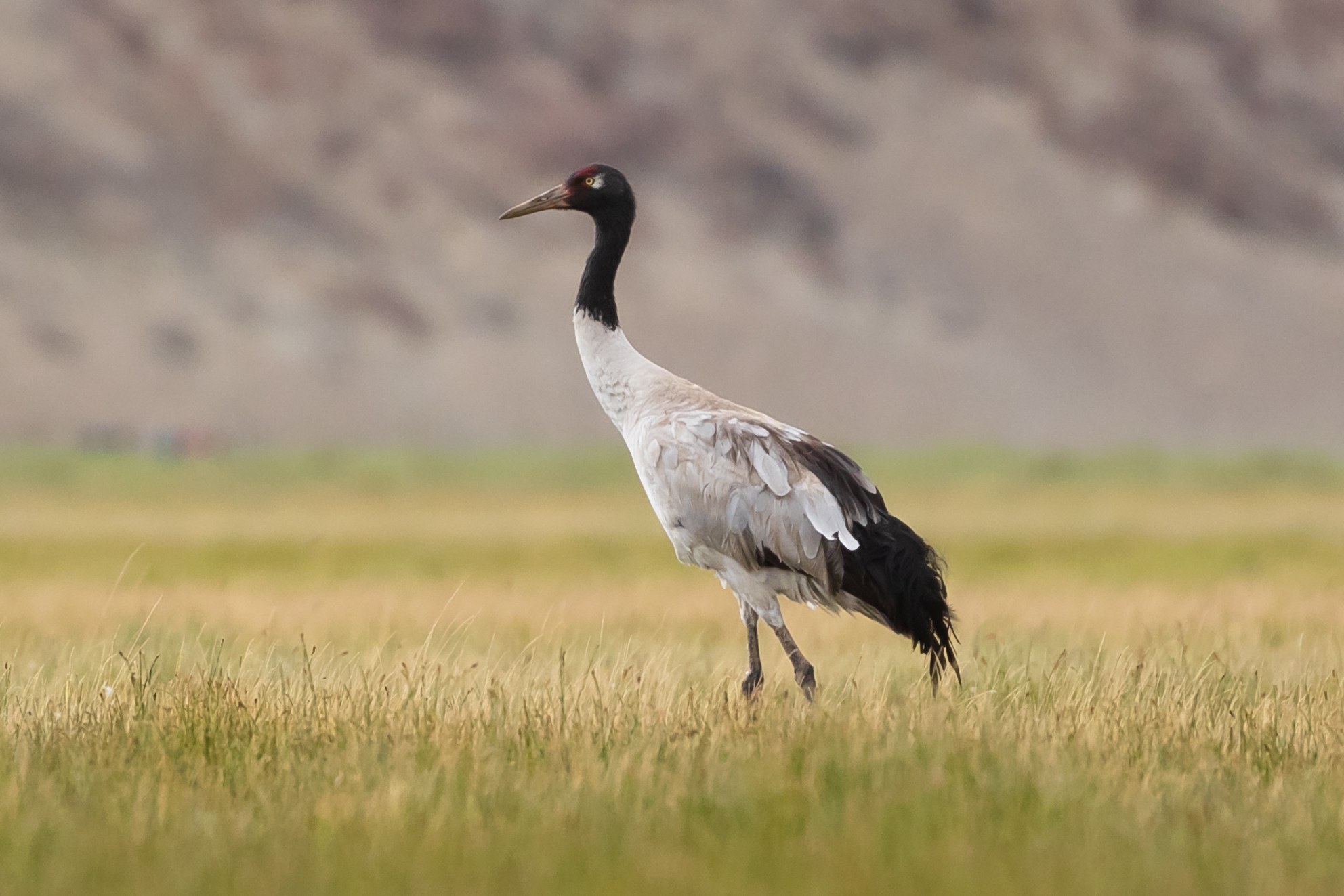
In Ladakh

Their loud trumpeting calls are similar to those of other cranes.

These birds are very wary, but in some areas they are accustomed to the local people who do not disturb them. These cranes appear to be able to distinguish people in traditional dress and are especially wary of others.

=== Diet and feeding ===
They feed on the tubers of sedges, plant roots, earthworms, insects and other invertebrates, frogs and other small vertebrates. They may also feed on fallen grains of barley, oats and buckwheat and will sometimes dig up and feed on potatoes, carrots and turnips.

Black-necked cranes forage on the ground in small groups, often with one bird acting as a sentinel. In winter, the groups arrive and leave the feeding grounds together, but may split into family groups, each group keeping their own small feeding territories in a big marshes or fields. They spend nearly 75% of the day foraging with peak feeding in the early morning and late afternoon. While foraging, they keep walking and they also walk long distances between the feeding spots. In this manner, they cover several kilometers a day while foraging.

=== Reproduction ===
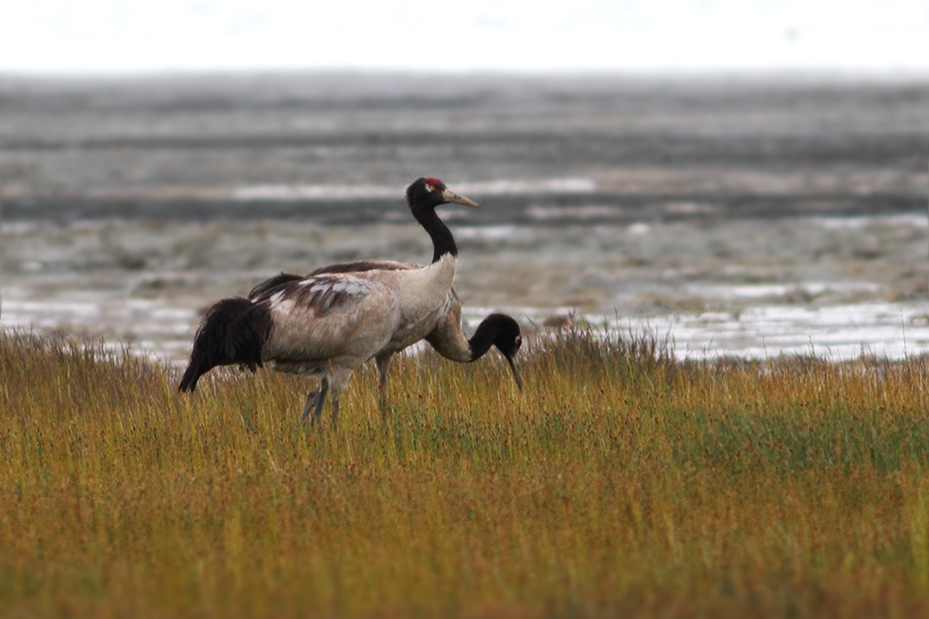
At Tso Kar, Ladakh, India. 100 odd of this species come to India every year for breeding.

Like many other crane species, they are believed to form long-lasting pair bonds and dancing displays are made during the breeding season. The breeding birds are territorial and will chase away any intruders of the same species immediately, though they are generally tolerant of other species. The nest site is usually a pre-existing mud island inside a large shallow wetland, sometimes shared along with bar-headed goose. The nest varies from a scantily lined scratch in the ground to a structure made of grass, rushes and weeds with a depression in the centre, sometimes the eggs laid directly on the grass without any structure. Eggs are laid mainly in May and June. One or two eggs. The birds are relatively more wary when the young ones are small. Till the time when the young ones are able to fly, the family kept moving around the nesting location, but later the family started traveling far and wide in the course of a day. Though the young ones are able to forage independently, usually they accompany the parents during foraging. Short, subdued nasal "kurrr" calls are used by the family to keep in contact and also by adults to indicate availability of food to juveniles. The adults were found to feed the young ones mainly with fish in Ladakh, adults fishing like herons.

== Status and threats ==
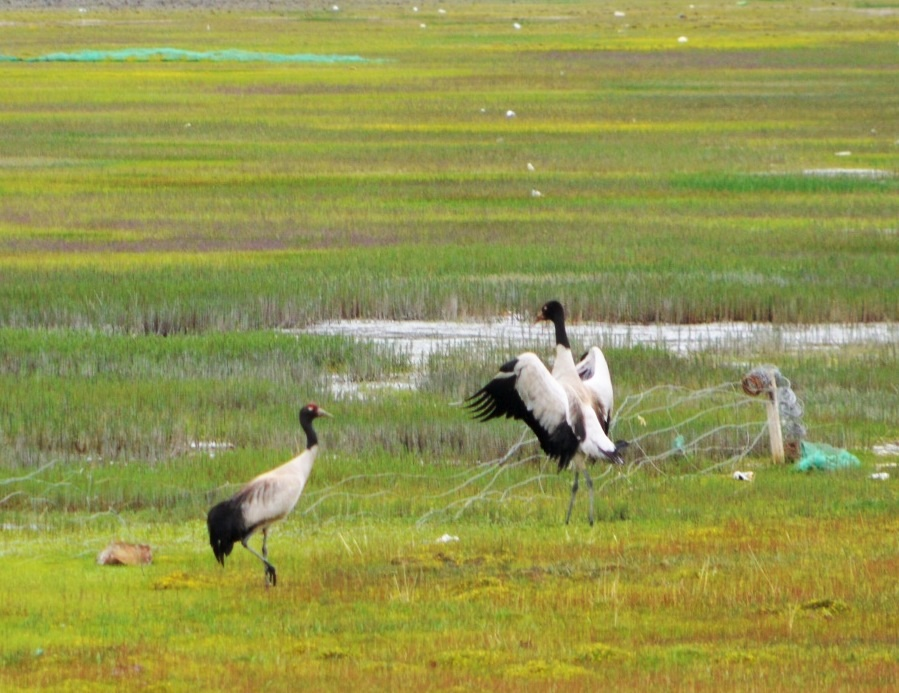
A couple of black-necked Tibetan cranes spotted in 2013 near Yamdrok Lake, Tibet Autonomous Region

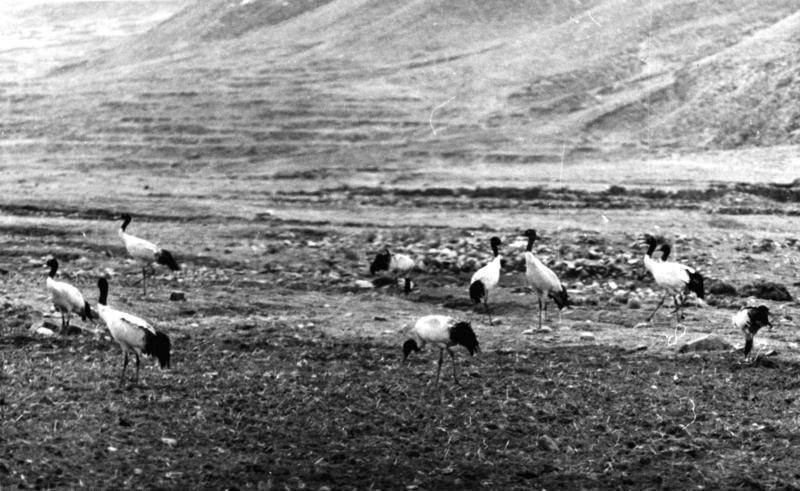
A 1938 photograph of a flock in the Brahmaputra valley

The estimated population of the black-necked crane was between 10,070 and 10,970 individuals as of 2013. These birds are legally protected in China, India and Bhutan. However, habitat modification, drying of lakes and agriculture are threats to the populations. In many areas, dogs belonging to herders are a major threat to young birds. An incident of leopards preying on the roosting cranes during the night has been recorded from the Phobjika valley of Bhutan. Despite protections, hunting continues to be a problem in parts of China and India. In Bhutan, collisions with power lines have been another cause of mortality in some areas. Eggs may also be preyed on by ravens that may use the opportunity provided when humans disturb the parents. The drying of wetlands can cause increased accessibility of the nests leading to predation while a rise in the water level can submerge nests. Loss and degradation of habitat are the main threats facing the black-necked cranes. The problems are most serious in the wintering areas, where wetlands are extensively affected by human activity including irrigation, dam construction, draining, and grazing pressure. In Tibet, widespread changes in traditional agricultural practices have reduced the availability of waste barley and spring wheat.

Populations in Bhutan are well protected both culturally and legally although some disturbance from tourism exists.

The black-necked crane is evaluated as near threatened on the IUCN Red List of Threatened Species. It is listed on Appendix I of CITES.

In 1991, an estimated 600 to 900 cranes inhabited the Hongyuan-Ruoergai Plateau, Sichuan, China, making it the most crucial breeding and summering area for the cranes at that time. According to a 2013 survey, the total crane population in the Zoigê Marsh was 893.

In 1996, there were about 4,000 of the birds, most of whom spent their winters in Tibet in the valleys of the Nyanga, Lhasa and Pengbo rivers and the middle reaches of the Yarlung Tsangpo. The Hutoushan Reservoir in the Pengbo valley is an important winter resting place, with a 96 square kilometres (37 mi^{2}) Linzhou Black-necked Crane Preservation Zone established in 1993. By 2018, Lhünzhub County's population of black-necked cranes had exceeded 2,100. The largest colony of black-necked cranes consisted of 400 to 500 individuals.

Black-necked cranes also winter in small numbers in two valleys of western Arunachal Pradesh, India. These are Sangti and Zemithang.

== Parasites ==
As all wild birds, black-necked cranes have a number of parasites. Modern parasitological studies are done with non-invasive means, i.e. without harming or killing. A 2024 study, based on metabarcoding of bird feces, found that black-necked cranes from the Dashanbao Black-necked Crane National Nature Reserve, China, harboured at least eight species of helminth parasites and three of protozoan parasites, and were carrying free-living amoebae.

== See also ==
- Black-necked cranes in Bhutan
