= Zhiyin Manke =

Chinese comic magazine

知音漫客 Zhiyin Manke
- Editor-in-chief: Zhu Jiajun (also known as Li Jing) (first); Chen Jing (Yinyin) (second, current)
- Categories: comic book
- Frequency: Weekly
- Circulation: 7 million (month)
- Publisher: Zhiyin Media Group's "Zhiyin Manke" Editorial Department
- First issue: January 1, 2006
- Company: Zhiyin Animation Co., Ltd.
- Country: China
- Based in: Hubei ProvinceWuhan City
- Language: Simplified Chinese
- Website: www.zymk.cn
- ISSN: 2095-1272

Chiyin Manke (Chinese: 知音漫客) is a weekly comic magazine sponsored and distributed by Zhiyin Animation Co., Ltd. Founded on January 1, 2006, it mainly publishes and serializes 16-page full-color comics. The price is uniformly 5 yuan. It is mainly distributed in mainland China, and most of the readers are middle school students. In 2007, Zhu Jiajun (Li Jing) changed Zhiyin Manke to a semi-monthly magazine, and in 2008, it was changed to 64 pages per issue. After October 2009, the publication frequency of Zhiyin Manke was changed to 80 pages per issue once a week.

The joint issue was launched in May 2020, and then revised to semi-monthly in December.

== History ==
Zhiyin Manke was founded in Wuhan, Hubei Province on January 1, 2006. The parent company is Zhiyin Media, and the founder is Zhu Jiajun (also known as Li Jing). The first edition is 100,000 copies. Zhu Jiajun set the initial price at 2 yuan per volume. In 2008, Zhiyin Manke was selected into the original animation work support project of the General Administration of Press and Publication of China and won a 200,000 t support fund. In 2010, Zhiyin Manke was selected into the "Original Power" China Original Animation Publishing Support Plan of the State Administration of Press and Publication. In 2011, Zhiyin Manke received a special guidance fund of 1 million yuan for newspaper development allocated by the Hubei Provincial Press and Publication Bureau.

In October 2007, the magazine was founded in the second half of the month, with a monthly circulation of 240,000 copies, with an investment loss of 940,000 yuan; in October 2008, it was changed to 64 pages per issue, with a monthly circulation of 840,000 copies, with a profit of 2.6 million yuan; in March 2009, the monthly circulation reached 1.02 million copies, an increase of 10% per issue, and the country The circulation of domestic and foreign periodicals and magazines generally declined due to the impact of the Great Recession. In October 2009, Zhiyin Group spent a huge amount of 10 million, and Zhiyin Manke was changed to 80 pages per week, with a revenue of 28 million yuan. The monthly circulation of the magazine in 2010 reached 2.6 million copies. In 2012, the monthly circulation of magazines exceeded 5.2 million, ranking first in China and third in the world, second only to Japan's Weekly Shonen Jump and Weekly Shonen Magazine. In 2013, Zhiyin Media achieved an operating revenue of 579 million yuan. During this period, the sales revenue of Zhiyin Manke was 196 million yuan, and the sales revenue of other animation journals and books based on Zhiyin Manke was 189 million yuan, with an annual net profit of more than 50 million yuan. The publication sales revenue of Zhiyin Manke surpassed that of Zhiyin magazine, accounting for more than 60 of the total revenue of Zhiyin Media (闺蜜杂志)., with a monthly circulation of 6.5 million copies, it became the first in China and the second in the world. At the end of 2013, nearly 1.6 billion copies were issued. In 2015, Zhiyin Manke occupied 80% of the market for Chinese comic book, with a monthly circulation of more than 7 million copies.

On May 25, 2014, Zhiyin Media reported Zhu Jiajun. Zhu Jiajun was taken away by the police for investigation. At the same time, Zhiyin Media dismissed Zhu Jiajun, and before that, Zhu Jiajun had a disard with other executives of Zhiyin Media. In the end, Zhu Jiajun was sentenced to 8 months in prison for accepting a bribe of 10,000 yuan. After being released from prison, Zhu Jiajun and other main founding members of the southin Manke founded Good Comics. On August 29, 2014, Hu Xunbi, chairman of Zhiyin, was dismissed for being a naked official, and Zhiyin Media is planning to IPO 690 million yuan, of which 447 million yuan was invested in the animation industry.

On May 18, 2023, some netizens posted the approval document of the Hubei Provincial Press and Publication Bureau. The document showed that "Hubei Zhiyin Media Group Co., Ltd.: Your company's "Rect for Instructions on the suspension of "Manke Painting Heart" and "Manke Painting" has been received. After research, it is agreed to "Syin Manke", "Manke Painting Heart" and "Manke Painting" Closed". The document shows the suspension time, from May to October 2023.

== Operation ==
There are three profit models of Zhiyin Manke: sales copyright, advertising profit and derivative development and related industry profit. In 2009, Zhiyin Animation Company established Zhiyin Animation College to train talents for the animation industry. In the same year, the company established a peripheral department. In 2010, Zhiyin Media spent 100 million yuan to develop Dragon Clan in an all-round way. In May 2015, Zhiyin Manke granted the priority adaptation rights of tens of thousands of comics to Shanghai "Oriental Two-dimensional" . In August 2015, Zhiyin Manke cooperated with Today's Headlines to launch Shiyin Headlines. In July 2015, the syin Manke reported the Manke · Longmen Award. Scripted works with a length of more than 60,000 words can participate in the competition. In addition to getting bonuses, the winners can also cooperate with first-line cartoonists, and the script fee will be paid separately after the work is published. On the basis of the 200,000 support fund obtained in 2008, Zhiyin Media invested 800,000 yuan to establish the Manke Million Fund . The syin also founded "Manke · Novel Painting", "Manke · Sunday" (poster discontinued), "Manke · Painting Heart", "Manke · Painting Meaning", "Manke · Burning Weekly", "Manke · Fairy Tale Painting", "Manke · Suspense" and other "Syin Manke" series of publications. Zhi.

== Awarded ==
| time | Organizer | award | Remarks |
|---|---|---|---|
| 2008 | Golden feather award | The best print media | |
| 2013 | State Administration of Press, Publication, Radio and Television of China | Top 100 Social Science Journals in China | |
| 2013 | People's Network | The 50 most popular journals among readers in the country | 3rd place |
| 2015 | State Administration of Press, Publication, Radio and Television of China | National Excellent Children's Newspapers | |

== See also ==
- Bosom Friend
- Shueisha
- Weekly Shōnen Jump
- Weekly Shōnen Magazine
