= Tujia =

Tujia may refer to:

- the Tujia people
- the Tujia language
- Tujia (company), a Chinese property rental company
