= Zhujia, Tibet =

Zhujia གྲུབ་བརྒྱ།
- Village and former township
- Location within Tibet
- Coordinates: 29°55′40″N 91°4′37″E
- Country: China
- Region: Tibet
- Prefecture: Lhasa Prefecture
- County: Lhünzhub County

Population
  - Major Nationalities: Tibetan
  - Regional dialect: Tibetan language
- Time zone: +8

Zhujia (Tibetan: གྲུབ་བརྒྱ།, Chinese: 朱加) is a village in Lhünzhub County in the Lhasa Prefecture of Tibet Autonomous Region, in China. It lies 25.5 kilometres (15.8 mi) by road west of Lhünzhub, near Hutoushan Reservoir. By road it is 90 kilometres (56 mi) from Lhasa, but considerably nearer to the north as the road forks around much further to the east first before approaching Lhünzhub and Zhujia. It appears to have been a township of Lhünzhub County, covering 126 square kilometers, with a population of 4000 at one point, with 12 village committees. However, the National Bureau of Statistics now lists Zhujia as a village and no longer as an official township-level division of Lhünzhub County.
