= Codoi =

Codoi may refer to:

- Elena Ceaușescu (1916–1989), nicknamed Codoi, wife of Romania's Communist leader Nicolae Ceaușescu
- Codoi, Lhari County, township of Tibet
- Chundui Township, or Codoi, in Tibet
