= Lhünzhub County =

Lhünzhub 林周县 • ལྷུན་གྲུབ་རྫོང་། Lhundrub, Linzhou
- County
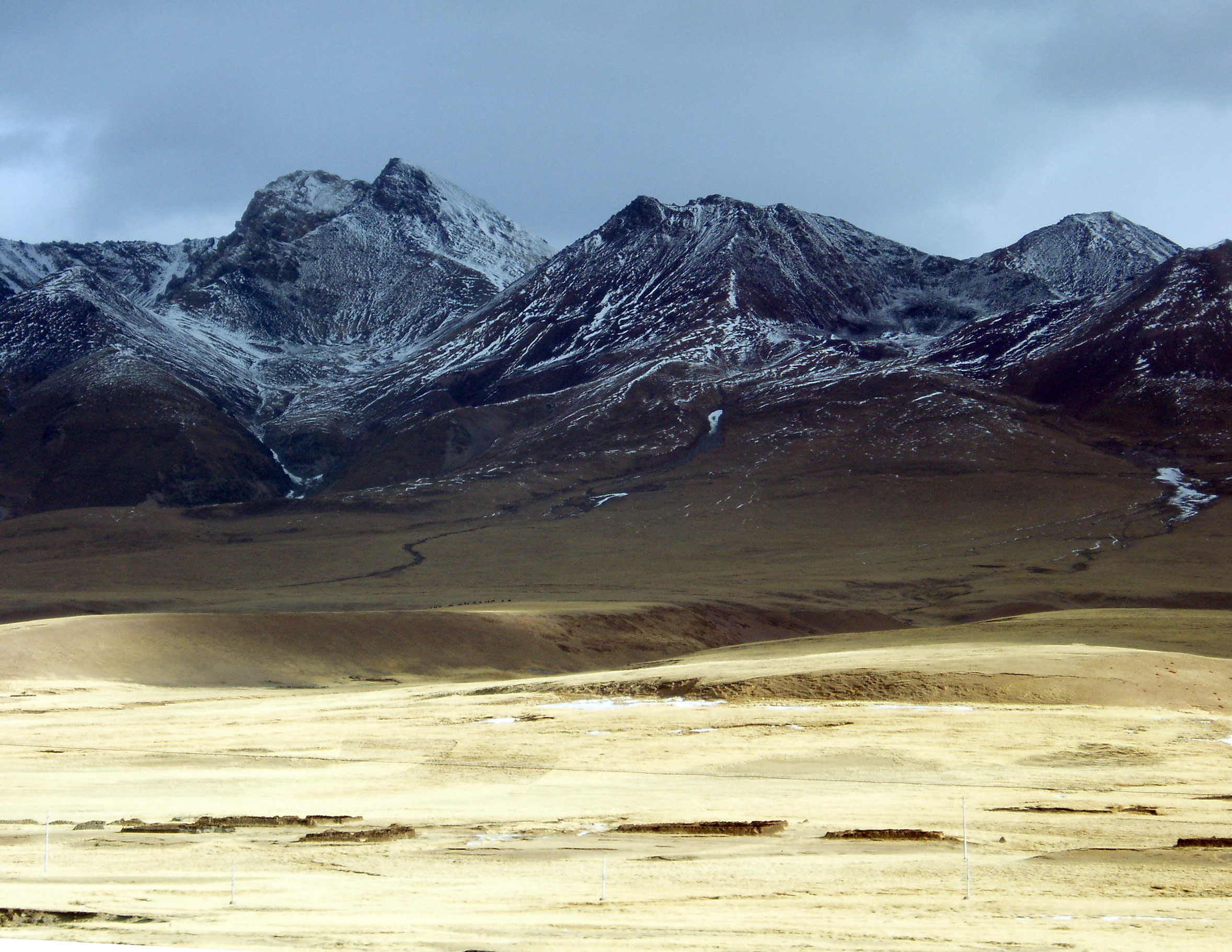
- Typical scenery of the Nyainqentanglha Mountains

- Location in Tibet Autonomous Region Lhünzhub (China)
- Coordinates (Lhünzhub government): 29°53′38″N 91°15′54″E
- Country: China
- Autonomous region: Tibet
- Prefecture-level city: Lhasa
- County seat: Ganden Chökhor (Lhünzhub)

Area
  - Total: 4,512 km^{2} (1,742 sq mi)

Population (2020)
  - Total: 50,596
  - Density: 11.21/km^{2} (29.04/sq mi)
- Time zone: UTC+8 (China Standard)
- Website: www.linzhouxian.gov.cn

Lhünzhub County

Chinese name
- Simplified Chinese: 林周县
- Traditional Chinese: 林周縣
Transcriptions
Standard Mandarin
- Hanyu Pinyin: Línzhōu Xiàn

Tibetan name
- Tibetan: ལྷུན་གྲུབ་རྫོང་།
Transcriptions
- Wylie: lhun grub rdzong
- Tibetan Pinyin: Lhünzhub Zong

Lhünzhub County, or Linzhou County (Chinese: 林周县) is a county in Lhasa towards the north-east of the main center of Chengguan, Tibet, China. It covers an area of 4,512 km^{2} (1,742 sq mi) and as of 2000 had a population of 50,895 people, almost all classified as rural. The southern portion, the Pengbo River Valley, contains fertile arable land, while the colder and more mountainous northern portion primarily supports grazing. The county has many monasteries, including the Reting Monastery.

The county was established as Lhünzhub Dzong in 1857. In 1959, it merged with Pundo Dzong (Chinese: 旁多两宗) to form the modern Lhünzhub County.

== Geography and climate ==
Lhünzhub County is situated in central Tibet, approximately 65 km (40 mi) northeast of Lhasa. The county encompasses the Pengbo River Valley and the upper reaches of the Lhasa River, covering an area of 4,512 km^{2} (1,742 sq mi). The region is geologically diverse, with an average elevation of 4,000 metres (13,000 ft). Lhünzhub County is rich in mineral resources, including lead, zinc, copper, silver, gold, and gypsum. The Nyainqêntanglha Mountains extend through the county, dividing it into southern and northern regions.

In the south the Pengbo valley has an average elevation of 3,680 metres (12,070 ft) with a mild climate. The average temperature is 5.8 °C (42.4 °F). The northern "three rivers" section, crossed by the Lhasa River and its tributary the Razheng River, is mountainous and has an average elevation of 4,200 metres (13,800 ft). It has average annual temperature of 2.9 °C (37.2 °F) and is mostly pastoral, with yak, sheep and goats. Wildlife includes roe deer, white-lipped deer, otter, black-necked crane, duck, Mongolian gazelle, and ibex. By 2018, Lhünzhub County's population of protected wild animals had exceeded 30,000, including over 2,100 black-necked cranes. The largest colony of black-necked cranes consisted of 400 to 500 individuals.

Medicinal plants and fungi include Cordyceps, Fritillaria, Rhodiola, and Ganoderma lucidum.

== Administration divisions ==
Lhünzhub County has jurisdiction over one town and 9 townships.

Name	Tibetan	Tibetan Pinyin	Chinese	Pinyin
Town
Ganden Chökhor Town (Lhünzhub)	དགའ་ལྡན་ཆོས་འཁོར།	Gadainqoikor Chongdai	甘丹曲果镇	Gāndānqūguǒ Zhèn
Tanggo Town	ཐང་མགོ	Tanggo Chongdai	唐古镇	Tánggǔ Zhèn
Qangka Town	བྱང་ཁ་	Qangga Chongdai	强嘎镇	Qiánggā Zhèn
Banjorling Town	དཔལ་འབྱོར་གླིང་	Baijorling Chongdai	边交林镇	Biānjiāolín Zhèn
Townships
Codoi Township	མཚོ་སྟོད་ཤང་།	Codoi Xang	春堆乡	Chūnduī Xiāng
Sumchêng Township	གསུམ་འཕྲེང་ཤང་།	Sumchêng Xang	松盘乡	Sōngpán Xiāng
Karze Township	མཁར་རྩེ་ཤང་།	Karzê Xang	卡孜乡	Kǎzī Xiāng
Jangraxa Township	ལྕང་ར་ཤར་ཤང་།	Jangraxar Xang	江热夏乡	Jiāngrèxià Xiāng
Ngarnang Township	ངར་ནང་ཤང་།	Ngarnang Xang	阿朗乡	Ālǎng Xiāng
Pundo Township	ཕུ་མདོ་ཤང་།	Pudo Xang	旁多乡	Pángduō Xiāng

=== Other settlements ===
- Zhujia (朱加)

== Economy ==
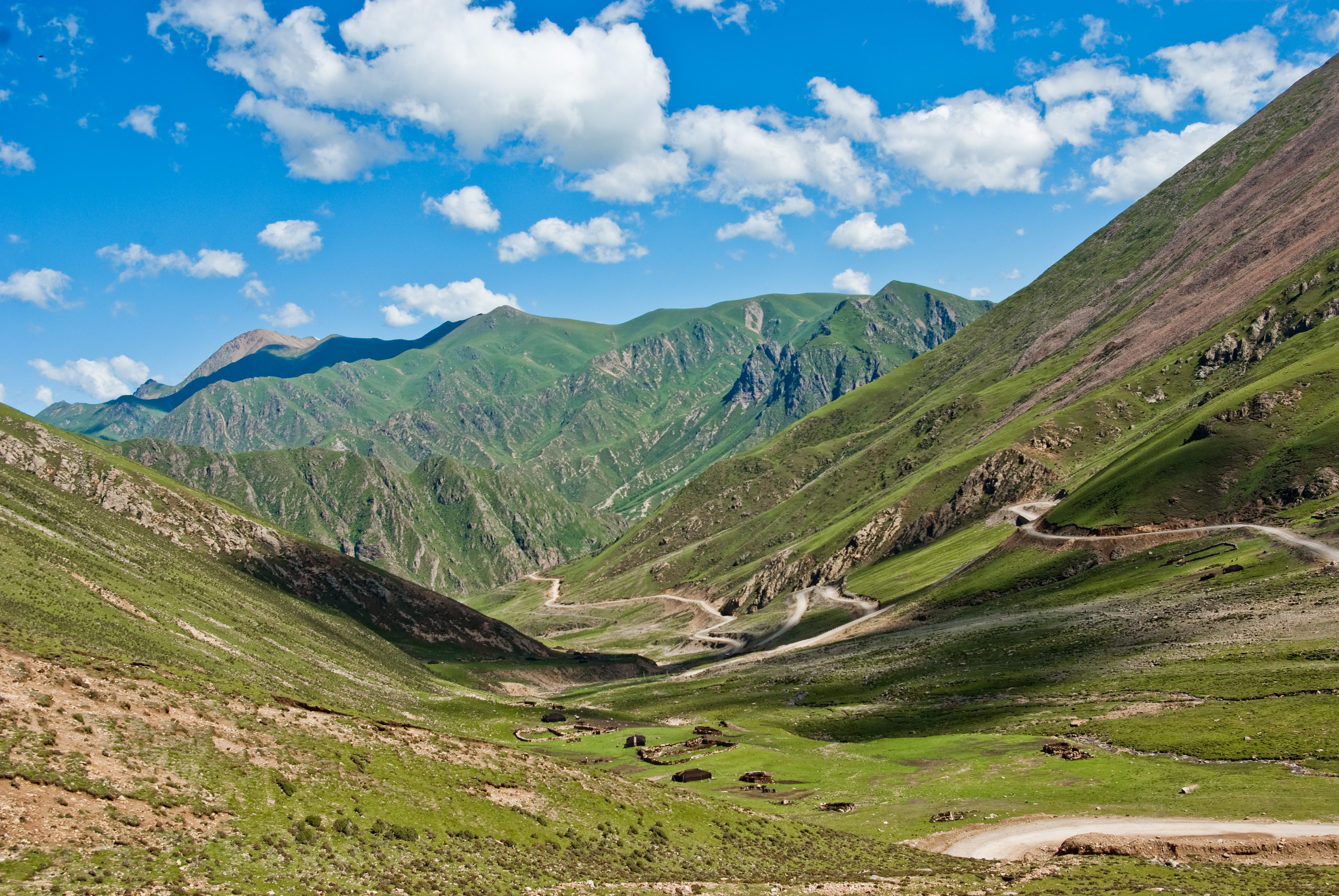
Landscape near Reting monastery

As of 2000 the county had a total population of 50,895, of which 8,111 lived in a community designated as urban. 2,254 had non-agricultural registration and 48,362 had agricultural registration. The Pengbo valley is the main grain-producing region of Lhasa Municipality and Tibet, with a total of 11,931 hectares (29,480 acres) of arable land. Crops include barley, winter wheat, spring wheat, canola and vegetables such as potato. The total output in 1999 was 57,600 tons of grain.

Livestock includes yak, sheep, goats and horses. Yaks graze at altitudes of 4,300 metres (14,100 ft) or more - higher than is practical with cattle. Crop residues are used for winter and spring feed. In 1996 more than 85% of winter and spring feed was straw, mostly barley straw. Linzhou county has been a leading testing and manufacturing center for frozen yak semen, and a center for selective breeding of yaks. Local enterprises prepare Tibetan medicinal plants and process wood products. Ethnic handicrafts are well developed, including weaving and mats. The Pengbo valley has a long history of pottery-making. Products include braziers, flower pots, vases, jugs and so on.

In 2010 the county had a GDP of 839 million yuan, and government revenue was 26.9 million yuan. Investment in fixed assets was 450 million yuan, excluding water conservancy. The per capita income of farmers and herdsmen was 4,587 yuan. (Note: A per capita income of 4,587 yuan converts to US$688 at an exchange rate of 0.15 dollars per yuan.) By the end of 2020, Linzhou County had identified over 20 types of metallic and non-metallic minerals, including lead, zinc, copper, iron, molybdenum, gold, silver, gypsum, coal, and mineral water. Of these, nine minerals—coal, iron ore, copper ore (along with associated minerals), lead, zinc, gold (with associated gold), silver (with associated silver), and barite—have been officially added to the reserve list.

== Infrastructure ==
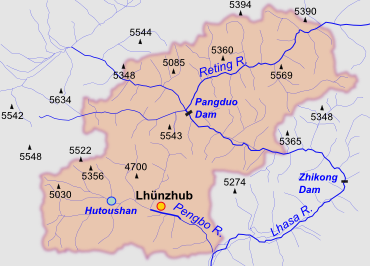
Hydrology

Hutoushan Reservoir lies in Qangka Township. The reservoir is bordered by large swamps and wet meadows, and has abundant plants and shellfish. The Hutuoshan Reservoir in the Pengbo valley is the largest in Tibet, with planned total storage of 12,000,000 cubic metres (420,000,000 cu ft). Endangered Black-necked cranes migrate to the middle and southern part of Tibet every winter, and may be seen on the reservoir.

There is a small hydropower station in Lhünzhub town. The Pangduo Hydro Power Station became operational in 2014.It impounds the Lhasa River in Pondo Township, about 63 kilometres (39 mi) from Lhasa. The reservoir holds 1,170,000,000 cubic metres (4.1×10^{10} cu ft) of water. The power station has total installed capacity of 160 MW, with four generating units. It has been called the "Tibetan Three Gorges".

The county has three major highways with total length of 160 kilometres (99 mi) and twelve rural roads, bringing the total road length to over 260 kilometres (160 mi). The county has a radio and television station. TV coverage is received by 72.1% of the population, and radio by 83.4% of the population. The county has 23 health care establishments, including a County People's Hospital with 30 beds. By the end of 2000 there were 122 medical personnel.

== Religion ==
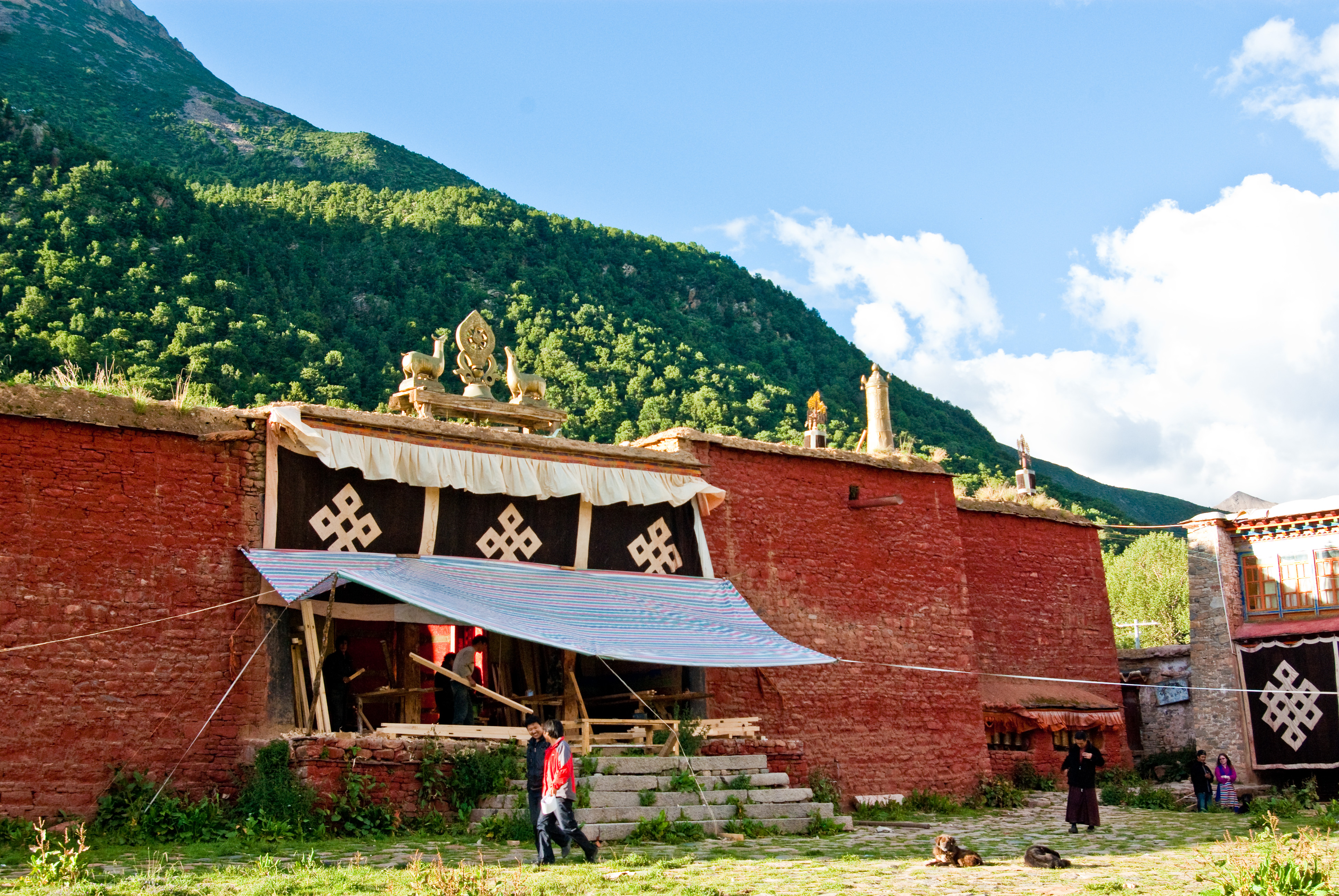
Reting Monastery

The county is a center of Tibetan Buddhism. There are thirty-seven gompas including twenty-five lamaseries with 919 monks and twelve nunneries with 844 nuns as of 2011. The breakdown by sect is twenty-six Gelug, six Kagyu and five Sakya.

Reting Monastery is located in Lhünzhub County and was built in 1056 by Dromtön (1005–1064), a student of Atiśa. It was the earliest monastery of the Gedain sect, and the patriarchal seat of that sect. In 1240 a Mongol force sacked the monastery and killed 500 people. The gompa was rebuilt. When the Gedain sect joined the Gelug sect in the 16th century the monastery adopted the reincarnation system. The incarnations are named Reting Rimpoche. Following an attempted rebellion against the Lhasa government in 1947 Reting was imprisoned in the Potala. After he died in May 1947 the monastery was looted and then razed. In recent years a lot of reconstruction work has been done. About 160 monks reside in Reting.

== Sources ==
- Bisht, Ramesh Chandra (2008-01-01). International Encyclopaedia Of Himalayas (5 Vols. Set). Mittal Publications. ISBN 978-81-8324-265-3.
- Goldstein, Melvyn C. (1991-05-19). A History of Modern Tibet, 1913-1951: The Demise of the Lamaist State. University of California Press. ISBN 978-0-520-91176-5.
- "Government Work Report". Linzhou People's Government Office. 2011-03-21. Archived from the original on 2015-02-15.
- Guan, Steve (2013-12-12). "Tibet commences new hydropower plant". China Coal Resource.
- Kapstein, Matthew T. (2013-06-05). The Tibetans. John Wiley & Sons. ISBN 978-1-118-72537-5.
- "Lhasa, Tibet Linzhou Hutoushan reservoir is a paradise for photographers". Tibet Travel Web (in Simplified Chinese).
- Lin, Karen (2013-12-12). "Black-Necked Cranes Flocking Back to Tibet". China Tibet Online.
- Ling, Haicheng (2005). Buddhism in China. 五洲传播出版社. ISBN 978-7-5085-0840-5.
- "Linzhou County Profile". Lhasa Municipal Bureau of Industry and Information. 2011-06-22. Archived from the original on 2016-03-04.
- "Linzhou Industry News". Lhasa Municipal Bureau of Industry and Information. 2011-06-22. Archived from the original on 2016-03-04.
- "Linzhou". TibetOL. China Intercontinental Communication Center.
- McCue, Gary (2010). Trekking in Tibet: A Traveler's Guide. The Mountaineers Books. ISBN 978-1-59485-411-8.
- Qin, Julia (2013-05-10). "Tibet key water-control project to be completed". China Tibet Online. Archived from the original on 2015-02-05.
- Shen, Dajun (July 1995). "Research on the rational use of water resources on the Lhasa River, Tibet" (PDF). Modelling and Management of Sustainable Basin-scale Water Resource Systems (Proceedings of a Boulder Symposium. IAHS. Archived from the original (PDF) on 2015-02-13.
- Suttie, J. M. (2003). Transhumant Grazing Systems in Temperate Asia. Food & Agriculture Org. ISBN 978-92-5-104977-8.
- "Tibet's biggest water-related project launched". China Tibet Online. 2009-08-06. Archived from the original on 2009-08-12.
- "'Tibet's Three Gorges Dam' starts operation". China Daily. 2013-12-11. Archived from the original on 2015-02-06.
- "XE Currency Table: CNY - Chinese Yuan Renminbi". XE.
- Yeh, Emily T.; Henderson, Mark (December 2008). "Interpreting Urbanization in Tibet". Journal of the International Association of Tibetan Studies. 4.
