= Jingkids International =

Online magazine

- Company type: Magazine
- Industry: Media
- Founded: 3 April 2005 in Beijing, China
- Founder: Michael Wester
- Website: www.beijing-kids.com

beijingkids (stylized with a lowercase "b") is an English-language online magazine covering the international school and family community in Beijing, China.

Launched originally in April 2005 as a quarterly guidebook called Kids in Beijing, the growth of the city's international schools soon drove the creation of a monthly magazine, tbjkids, which was eventually renamed beijingkids.

== Readership ==
The circulation peaked at 20,000 copies and the brand maintains a website updated daily that reaches approximately 20,000 active visitors a month, according to Google Analytics.

The magazine's tagline is "Beijing's Essential International Family Resource" and covers the school communities throughout the city, as well as provides family lifestyle information for parents and parents-to-be.

In addition to its monthly titles and an active blog, the magazine also produces a comprehensive annual guide to international schools in Beijing at the beginning of each calendar year, followed by a large-scale exposition, the Jingkids International School Expo, featuring over 80 international K-12 schools as well as preschools.

beijingkids is produced by True Run Media, which also runs The Beijinger and beijingkids' sister brand, Jingkids. Jingkids covers the international school community in Mandarin Chinese and caters to well-to-do Chinese families seeking an international education for their children.
