= The Beijinger =

Chinese English-language website

The Beijinger 北京人
- Publisher: True Run Media
- Founded: 2001
- Country: China
- Based in: Beijing
- Language: English
- Website: https://www.thebeijinger.com/
- ISSN: 1673-0178

The Beijinger (Chinese: 北京人, stylized as "the Beijinger" or "thebeijinger") is a free monthly English language listings and entertainment website and magazine produced by True Run Media in Beijing, China. It was founded in October 2001, as that's Beijing. In June 2008, True Run Media was required to rename that's Beijing to The Beijinger because of trademark issues. A newly created and unrelated that's Beijing magazine was launched under the ownership of China Electric Media, and China International Press.

The magazine has a weekly newsletter discussing the city's events and lists places' addresses in both Chinese characters and pinyin. It has classified advertising and personal advertisement sections that allow users to find housing, employment, and relationships as well as buy and sell goods.

== History ==
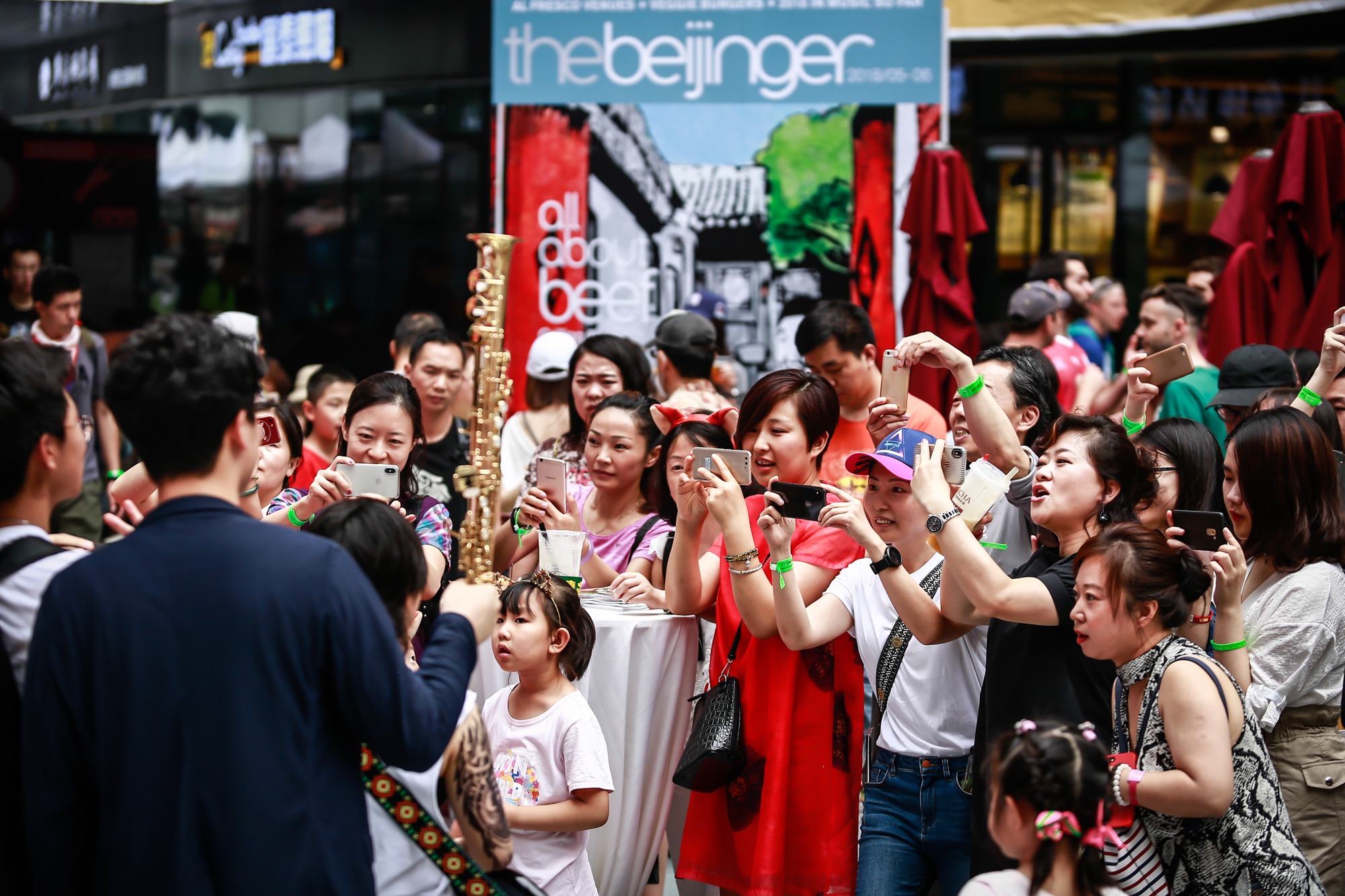
The Beijinger's pizza festival

The Beijinger is a free listings and lifestyle magazine published at the beginning of each month by expatriates and available in numerous restaurants bars, hotels, and cafes in Beijing. Founded in October 2001, as that's Beijing, it has been owned by True Run Media since the beginning. Mike Wester was the founding producer and the general manager of the magazine. The editor Jeremy Goldkorn assisted in creating the magazine.

Government licenses to run publications require substantial money and work, so the magazine opted to rely on collaborations with Chinese companies to get approval. The magazine in this way occupied a "legal grey zone". The State Council Information Office-backed China Intercontinental Press owned the "that's Beijing" brand. Over many months of discussions about the magazine with True Run Media, a private company, China Intercontinental Press attempted to expand its authority and profits. China Intercontinental Press terminated the partnership in June 2008. Mike Wester, the general manager, said in an interview, "It just didn't seem fair, but it's totally within their rights because they control the brand. This is just the way business works in China."

That month, that's Beijing was required to rename to The Beijinger after China Electric Power News' subsidiary China Electricity Media purchased the "that's" trademark from China Intercontinental Press. The first The Beijinger issue was released in July 2008 after the publisher and editorial staff decided to continue the magazine. Under the ownership of China Electric Media and China International Press, a newly created and unrelated that's Beijing magazine was planned to release its first issue that month.

== Overview ==
The magazine has a weekly newsletter discussing the city's events and lists places' addresses in both Chinese characters and pinyin. It has blogs and forums and routinely reviews newly opened bars and clubs. Although the English-language website's primary audience is people from outside of China, Beijing women make a substantial number of postings in the personal advertisement section, seeking relationships with foreigners. Some of the women who have made posts had obtained master's degrees from American, Australian, British, Canadian universities. Calling themselves "nontraditional", the women say they have trouble rejoining Chinese society after having until just a while ago been out of the country for so long. The writer Roseann Lake said the website had a "very lively" classified advertising section. Expatriates in Beijing frequently use its classified ads when they need to secure housing. The website has several hundred housing options available, allowing expatriates to use an English-language resource to do their search (as most other options are in Mandarin) and to find roommates from countries outside of China.

Many agents on The Beijinger will take advantage of expatriates' ignorance, levying rental rates that are far above a property's market value. For example, while a Chinese tenant might pay a monthly rent of CN¥1,000 (US$151) through a room found on a Chinese website, an expatriate might may have to pay CN¥2,000 (US$302) on The Beijinger. A downside of the website is that listings largely come from letting agents, who charge fees. There could be very few options in expatriates' desired location still remaining after excluding agent-listed properties. The website also offers homestays. Expatriates can use the site to sell and buy furniture, bicycles, and scooters.

The website has a feature "Echinacities" that lets people browse a substantial number of jobs. Users can choose jobs that are freelance, part-time, or full-time and filter by location. They can choose jobs in the secretarial, IT, and teaching sectors. Since a posting will include the employer's email address, users can apply directly instead of having to create an account on The Beijinger. Around 2010, the company Rent A Laowai ("laowai" means "foreigner" in Chinese) created an ad listing on The Beijinger offering to rent foreigners to foreigners. The ad said, "Occasionally companies want a foreign face to go to meetings and conferences or to go to dinners and lunches and smile at the clients and shake people's hands. There are job opportunities for girls who are pretty and for men who can look good in a suit."

The magazine puts on the Hot and Spicy Festival every year, a two-day event featuring worldwide spicy food. At the Canadian International School of Beijing, it hosts a five-minute hot pepper challenge to celebrate Canada Day in which participants are asked to consume as many of the peppers as possible. They are given 100 hot peppers, water, and yogurt. Drinking water was allowed, but consuming yogurt would mean participants had given up.

From 2001 to 2011, the writer Kaiser Kuo wrote a Beijinger column titled "Ich Bin Ein Beijinger" that discussed his experiences in Beijing. The column's German-language name means "I am a Beijinger" and is inspired by the 1963 speech "Ich bin ein Berliner" ("I am a Berliner") that John F. Kennedy gave in West Berlin.

== Reception ==
Food critic Michael Shafran called The Beijinger an "influential magazine". Fodor's said that The Beijinger provides "the most critical and comprehensive coverage" of dance shows, plays, and concerts alongside Time Out Beijing and is "the best way to find out what's on and where to party" with the "most extensive listings". Rough Guides in 2003 called that's Beijing "irreverent and informative", noting it had a "giant listings section" with "the more underground gigs". Lonely Planet in 2007 found the magazine to be "slick and confident" as well as "well-designed, well written and the best of the bunch" of free English-language publications given at hotels.

China Daily's Edward Mills wrote in 2011 that, disregarding restaurant reviews' quality, The Beijinger, along with Chinese website Dianping and fellow expatriate website Localnoodles, were among "the most popular locations for finding comments from the 'man in the street'". The author Roseann Lake called the website "a bit of a cross between TimeOut and Craigslist". The Brazilian newspaper Folha de S.Paulo said in 2010 that among the publications that help the over 100,000-strong expatriate group in Beijing, The Beijinger is "the most famous publication and has a very useful website".
