= Plastics News Global Group =

Industry publications

The Crain's Global Polymer Group is a collection of plastics- and rubber-related publications operated by Crain Communications Inc. in Detroit, Michigan.

Crain Communications Inc., PN’s parent company, acquired Emap's polymer-related assets in July 2007 to form the Plastics News Global Group. Those properties, headquartered in Croydon, England, include Plastics & Rubber Weekly and the monthly European Plastics News. The 11,800-circulation PRW has been serving the U.K. plastics industry since 1964. European Plastics News launched in 1974, and is the only pan-European magazine serving the entire plastics manufacturing sector, including the growing industry in central and Eastern Europe. It circulates to 13,800 subscribers in 20 countries.

Via its 2007 deal with Emap, Plastics News also inherited a publishing licensing agreement with the management of the Singapore-based trade magazine Asian Plastics News, which has since expired.

== Assets ==
Plastics News (North America) — Plastics News, the Plastics Encounter trade show, the PN Executive Forum and other North American conferences.
