= Ngarnang Township =

Coordinates: 30°06′N 91°30′E

Ngarnang (Chinese: 阿朗; pinyin: Ālǎng) is a village and township-level division of Lhünzhub County, in the Lhasa Prefecture of the Tibet Autonomous Region of China.

== See also ==
- List of towns and villages in Tibet
