= Plastindia =

Plastindia Foundation is an apex body of plastics industry founded by major associations, organisations and institutions of plastics industry of India, it is also supported by the Ministry of Chemicals and Fertilizers, Government of India connected with plastics. Plastindia Exhibition and Conference is held every three years. It is usually organized in the first or second week of February.

Plastindia Foundation's objective is to promote the development of plastic industry and to assist the growth of plastic and related products. The foundation aims at national progress through plastics. The foundation focuses on helping India to become the proffered sourcing base of plastic products around the world and also concentrates on facilitating the export led growth of the Indian plastic industry. It also helps boost export business volumes and revenues.

In 2020, Plastindia called off its trade show which was set to be held at New Delhi due to the COVID-19 pandemic.

Years	Total Gross Exhibition Area (in m^{2})	No. of countries participated (Exhibitors)	No of countries participated (Overseas)
1990	19600	486	68
1994	27000	671	76
1997	39800	751	210
2000	46000	1055	225
2003	48286	1109	214
2006	65541	1288	327
2009	77604	1517	476
