= Tujia (company) =

Chinese short-term rental company

- Type: Private
- Industry: Travel
- Founded: December 1, 2011; 14 years ago
- Founders: Justin Luo; Melissa Yang
- Headquarters: Beijing, China
- Services: Vacation rentals
- Website: content.tujia.com

Tujia (Chinese: 途家; meaning "home on the way" or "mid-journey home") is a Chinese peer-to-peer property rental company founded in 2011 by Justin Luo and Melissa Yang. In October 2017, the company raised $300 million in new investment, giving it a valuation of more than $1.5 billion.

== History ==
=== Establishment ===
Founded in December 2011 by Justin Luo and Melissa Yang, the latter of whom was then director of deployment for the search engine Microsoft Bing for Asian markets, Tujia was one of a number of Chinese companies established to adapt the models created following the success of HomeAway and Airbnb. In May 2012, HomeAway announced that it would purchase a minority stake in Tujia, joining Ctrip, Lightspeed China Partners and CDH Investments as investors in the company.

Tujia completed its Series A financing in 2012 and Series B financing in 2013, raising a combined RMB 400 million in the two rounds. In June 2014, it raised another $100 million in Series C financing. In 2015, Tujia raised $300 million in a further financing round, giving the company a valuation of more than $1 billion.

=== Acquisitions and expansion ===
In June 2016, Tujia acquired rival Mayi.com, which had been established at around the same time as Tujia as the Chinese short-term rental market developed. Later that year, Tujia acquired the homestay businesses of Ctrip and Qunar, including their homestay booking channels and operating teams.

In October 2017, Tujia raised $300 million in a new funding round, increasing its valuation to more than $1.5 billion. Airbnb also considered a merger with Tujia that year involving an exchange of equity stakes, but the companies did not proceed with the transaction.

In 2018, Tujia acquired Taiwan-founded accommodation booking platform Fishtrip as part of an expansion of its overseas business. Tujia received backing from Tencent and Trip.com Group (formerly Ctrip.com International Ltd.). Yu Holdings, owned by Chinese fashion figure Wendy Yu, also invested in Tujia.

As of 2018, Tujia had operations in 345 locations in China and more than 1,000 international partnerships. That year, the company was reported to have about 650,000 listings, and an approximately 24.5% share of the Chinese short-term rental market. LUX Magazine described the company as serving China's growing affluent traveling population.

In 2019, Tujia was described as having 310,000 properties across 255 destinations in China. In 2020, KrASIA reported that Tujia led China's home-sharing market "with around 60% market share", ahead of Airbnb, Meituan Minsu and Xiaozhu. That year, however, the COVID-19 pandemic significantly affected the short-term rental market in China, leading Tujia to lay off 40% of its staff and suspend its self-operated properties in 20 cities. The company instead shifted toward discounted longer-term rentals in an effort to maintain occupancy and revenue.

In 2022, after Airbnb announced its withdrawal from the domestic Chinese market, Tujia, Meituan and Xiaozhu said they would take over listings from some landlords who had previously used Airbnb. Barron's reported that Tujia and Xiaozhu had accumulated substantially more listings across more locations in China than Airbnb, attributing part of their position to their local presence. In 2023, Tujia reported that bookings of bed-and-breakfast stays through its platform were 120% higher than in the comparable pre-pandemic period in 2019, amid increased demand for homestays offering distinctive experiences.

=== Legal issues ===
In August 2026, Beijing housing authorities imposed an administrative penalty on Tujia Online Information Technology (Tianjin) Co. for failing to conduct required reviews of information and supporting documentation submitted for short-term rental listings. The platform was asserted to have permitted listings for properties in Beijing's core functional area that did not meet applicable requirements, with some lacking required public-security documentation. Tujia was ordered to correct the violations in June, and authorities subsequently indicated that the necessary remediations had been undertaken.

In September 2026, it was reported that the government was investigating companies in the technology space, including Tujia, for possible violations of unfair competition law. Tujia indicated through social media posts that it was cooperating with the investigation.

== Business model ==
Tujia operates a booking platform for short-term rentals, long-term rentals, and bed-and-breakfast accommodations. In the post-pandemic period, the company has generally reported growth in demand for homestays and experience-based travel accommodations in China.

Contemporary coverage described Tujia's service as resembling Airbnb, while incorporating features designed for Chinese travel preferences. Tujia has frequently been compared with Airbnb and HomeAway, but developed a business model adapted to the Chinese vacation-rental market. Rather than limiting itself to connecting individual property owners with renters, the company has focused in part on professionally managed serviced apartments, including properties left vacant by developers and individual owners. Its inventory has included inns, apartments, resorts, homestays and villas.

Tujia has also provided property-management services. Under one model, rather than leasing properties from owners for fixed payments, Tujia manages the properties and shares rental revenue with their owners when the properties are occupied. The company has dealt directly with renters and has offered housekeeping and property-management services. This model reduced the need for Tujia to incur the fixed costs associated with contracting for properties irrespective of occupancy. Property-management staff have also been utilized to provide cleaning and round-the-clock service at some properties, with some listings offering additional services such as butlers, bicycles, and car rentals. The platform has emphasized rentals of entire houses, apartments and condominiums, a model intended in part to accommodate Chinese travelers who travel in larger family or social groups, and who may prefer not to share accommodations with strangers.
