= China Plastic & Rubber Journal =

Chinese trade journal

China Plastic & Rubber Journal (CPRJ) is a leading bimonthly Chinese magazine distributed to qualified professionals and decision markers in the industry. It has been published since 1982 with a controlled circulation of 29,760 copies per issue. Appointed as the "Official Publication of Chinaplas", Asia's No. 1 exhibition for the plastics and rubber industries. The publisher is Adsale Publishing Limited.

In addition to the controlled circulation of 29,670 copies per issue, CPRJ has extra distribution at more than 30 key global and local trade shows including K, NPE and Chinaplas, offering advertisers the chance to reach around 1 million show visitors.
