= Gandainqoikor =

Lhünzhub
- Town

Tibetan transcription(s)

Chinese transcription(s)
- Location within Tibet
- Coordinates: 29°54′1″N 91°15′34″E
- Country: China
- Province: Tibet Autonomous Region
- Prefecture: Lhasa Prefecture
- County: Lhünzhub County
- Time zone: UTC+8 (CST)

Lhünzhub, or Ganden Chökhor (Tibetan: དགའ་ལྡན་ཆོས་འཁོར, Chinese: 甘丹曲果镇) is a small town, the administrative center of Lhünzhub County in the Lhasa Prefecture of Tibet, China. It is located northeast of Lhasa.

Lhünzhub has jurisdiction over six villages, with a population of 7349 people, all ethnic Tibetan. The economy is dominated by agriculture and animal husbandry. There are 27,640 acres (11,190 ha) of arable land producing barley, wheat, rape and other crops. The town has a primary school and a clinic. There is a small hydropower station. The town lies on the Pengbo River.

The average temperature is 6.9 °C (44.4 °F) and the average annual precipitation is 414 millimetres (16.3 in). January is the driest month, with no rainfall, and August is the wettest with an average of 122 millimetres (4.8 in).

== Sources ==
- "Climate: ལྷུན་གྲུབ་ 甘丹曲果镇". Climate-Data.org.
