= Hutoushan Reservoir =

Reservoir in Lhünzhub, Tibet, China

- 虎头山水库 (Chinese)
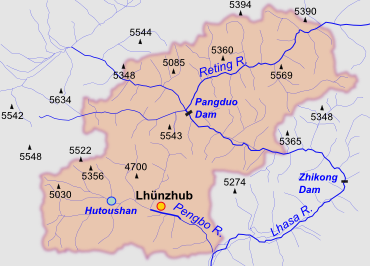
- Hutoushan Reservoir is in the west of Lhünzhub County

- Location in Tibet
- Coordinates: 29°55′5″N 91°5′21″E
- Type: Reservoir
- Basin countries: Tibet, China
- Water volume: 12 million cubic metres (9,700 acre⋅ft)

Hutoushan Reservoir (Chinese: 虎头山水库, Hutoushan Shuiku) is a man made reservoir in Lhünzhub County, Tibet, to the north of the city of Lhasa. It is an important wintering place for black-necked cranes and other migratory birds.

== Location ==
The reservoir lies in Qangka Township, Lhünzhub County. The villages of Gana, Tiangacun, Seronggang and Zhujiecun lie near the lake. The reservoir is bordered by large swamps and wet meadows, and has abundant plants and shellfish. It takes its name from a nearby mountain, whose shape was said to resemble a tiger's head. The Hutuoshan Reservoir is the largest in Tibet, with planned total storage of 12,000,000 cubic metres (420,000,000 cu ft). The reservoir lies in the Pengbo River valley.

== Black-necked cranes ==
The endangered black-necked cranes migrate to the middle and southern part of Tibet every winter, and may be seen on the reservoir. The cranes migrate from the frozen Changtang Grassland in northern Tibet in mid- to late-October, and overwinter in Linzhou (Lhünzhub) County. They return when the weather becomes warmer, in late March. They are the only species of crane that lives and breeds at these high elevations. In 2013 the population in Linzhou County was over 1,000. Village volunteers patrol the 96-square-kilometre (37 sq mi) Linzhou Black-necked Crane Preservation Zone, established in 1993, where the cranes eat the remains of farm crops. A monitoring platform has been built to watch the health of the birds. Flocks of the birds stay on the HuTouShan Reservoir overnight, where they can be observed around daybreak before they fly off to search for forage.

== Sources ==
- "Lhasa, Tibet Linzhou Hutoushan reservoir is a paradise for photographers". Tibet Travel Web (in Chinese).
- Lin, Karen (2013-12-12). "Black-Necked Cranes Flocking Back to Tibet". China Tibet Online.
- "Paradise for Birds - Birds Watching Tour in Lhasa". China Mobile Group Xizang Company. 2014-04-01. Archived from the original on 2015-02-13.
- Shen, Dajun (July 1995). "Research on the rational use of water resources on the Lhasa River, Tibet" (PDF). Modelling and Management of Sustainable Basin-scale Water Resource Systems (Proceedings of a Boulder Symposium. IAHS. Archived from the original (PDF) on 2015-02-13.
- Zhang, Hao (2013-12-16). "Black-necked crane ends winter migration in Lhasa". China Central Television. Archived from the original on 2015-02-13.
