= Wendy Yu =

Chinese heiress and philanthropist

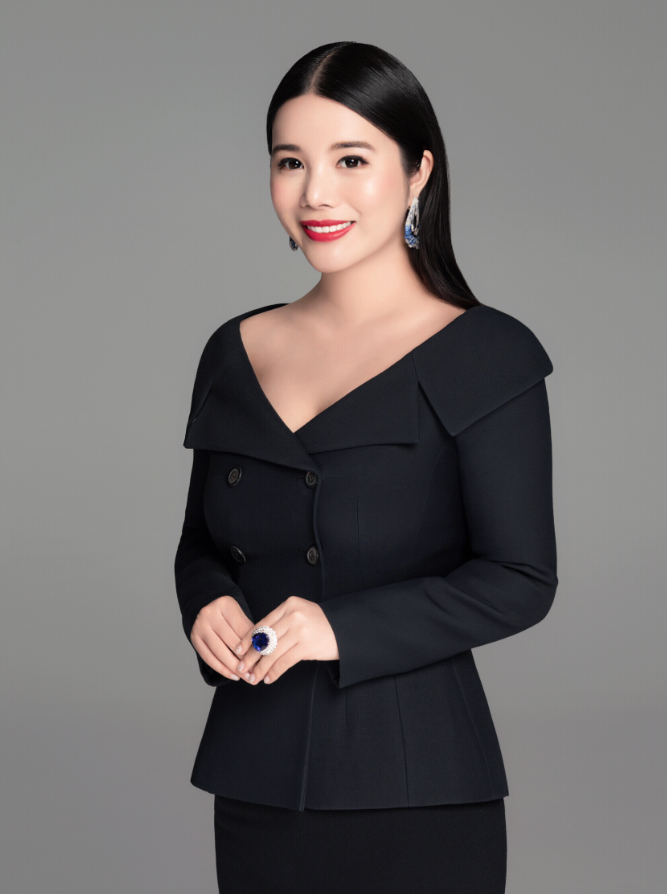
- Yu in 2018
- Born: Zhejiang province, China
- Occupations: CEO, Yu Holdings; investor; philanthropist

Wendy Yu (Chinese: 余晚晚; pinyin: Yú Wǎnwǎn) is a Chinese heiress, investor, patron of the arts, and philanthropist. She is the founder of Yu Holdings and the first Asian contributor to Vogue.

== Early life and education ==
Born in the Zhejiang province of China, south of Shanghai, Yu is the only daughter of Jingyuan Yu, billionaire founder of the Mengtian Group, Asia's largest manufacturer of wooden doors. Her father "groomed her to be a businesswoman from an early age". A self-described "geeky tomboy" as a teenager, Yu had a fascination with calculus and data. She excelled at math while attending junior school in Hangzhou, and completed training for the China Girls Mathematical Olympiad.

At age 15, she moved to England to attend the Taunton School, Somerset. There, Yu became interested in fashion, and went on to study Fashion Management at the London College of Fashion, graduating in 2013 with a degree in fashion management. She also completed executive programs at the Judge Business School at the University of Cambridge, the Oxford Investing Program at the University of Oxford on impact investing and the Emerging Leader Development Program at Columbia University in New York City. While in school, Yu was presented to society at the International Debutante Ball in New York and the Queen Charlotte's Ball in London.

== Career and philanthropy ==
Yu interned at Vogue China in 2012, under the editorship of Angelica Cheung. She returned to China after completing her studies in London to work for the Mengtian Group, where she was made vice chairman in 2015.

In 2015 she founded Yu Capital, an investment firm focused on emerging businesses in the fashion, lifestyle, and technology sectors, which evolved into Yu Holdings in 2017. Yu Holdings has invested in Chinese companies including DiDi and property rental company Tujia.com, as well as individual designers, including Mary Katrantzou. Yu brought Katrantzou to China in April 2018, and connected her to other potential investors.

Through her fashion ventures and her personal style, Yu has established herself as an influence on fashion in China, particularly with respect to luxury brands. In December 2017, the Chinese business magazine Gafencu Men listed Yu as one of the 300 most powerful people in China, and the Hong Kong edition of Tatler named her one of Asia's eight most stylish women. In August 2018, Forbes China included Yu in their annual "30 Under 30" (listing elite members in various fields who are under 30 years old), in the field of Art and Fashion, for her role as CEO of Yu Holdings. Yu also has a substantial social media following, with over 700,000 Weibo followers.

In early 2018, Yu endowed the position of the Wendy Yu Curator in Charge of The Costume Institute, at the Metropolitan Museum of Art in Manhattan. Andrew Bolton was named to the position, whom Yu met through her friendship with Vogue editor-in-chief Anna Wintour, who has described Yu as having "a globally minded view" of fashion.

Yu has also become a patron of the arts through the support of London institutions, including the Victoria and Albert Museum, the National Portrait Gallery, London, and the British Fashion Council Fashion Trust. With respect to the Victoria and Albert Museum, Yu was a founding member of the institution's Young Patrons' Circle. Based on her support of the fashion industry, Vogue has described her as "one of the youngest as well as one of the most significant donors in fashion today". She is also the first Asian contributor to Vogue.

== Personal life ==
Yu lives in Shanghai. She has a couture and accessory collections and limited edition Barbie dolls, which she has indicated that she intends to eventually display in a fashion museum in China. In January 2018, Yu hosted a Chinese New Year dinner at Britain's Kensington Palace.

== See also ==
- Anna Wintour Costume Center
- Chinese people in New York City
- Fashion design
- Haute couture
- Met Gala
- Wenzhounese
