= Dashanbao Black-necked Crane National Nature Reserve =

Natural reserve in Yunnan, China

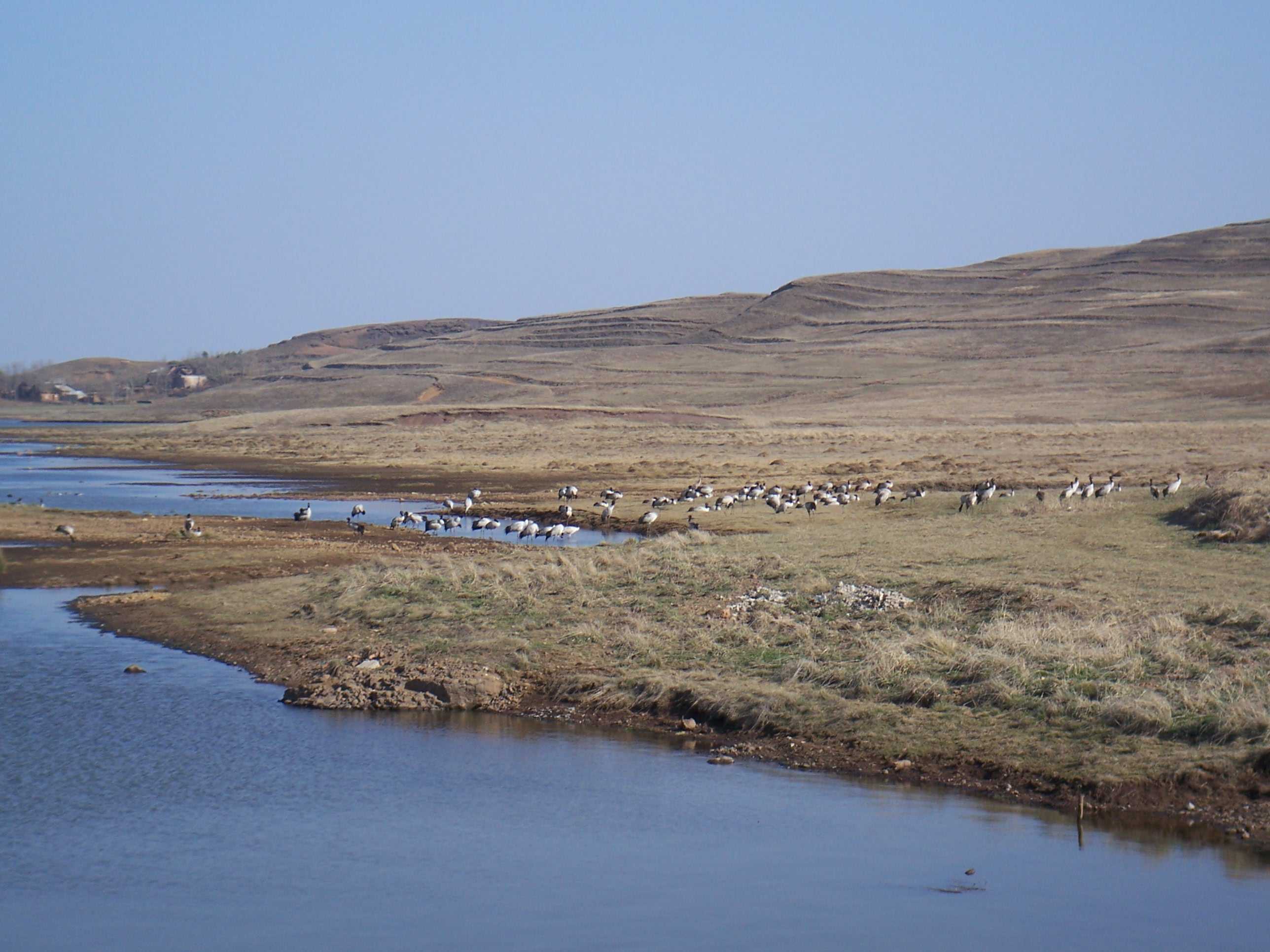

- Location within China
- Location: Yunnan Province, China
- Nearest city: Zhaotong
- Coordinates: 27.38333°N 103.26667°E
- Area: 19,200 ha (74 sq mi)
- Created: 1990

Ramsar Wetland
- Official name: Dashanbao
- Designated: 7 December 2004
- Reference no.: 1435

The Dashanbao Black-necked Crane National Nature Reserve (Chinese: 大山包国家级自然保护区; pinyin: Dàshānbāo Guójiā Jízìrán Bǎohùqū) is a state-level nature reserve located in Dashanbao Township, Zhaoyang District, Zhaotong prefecture-level city, Yunnan Province, China. The reserve has been set up to protect a total area of 19,200 hectares of plateau marshland at altitudes between 2,200 and 3,300 meters that provide winter habitat for the Black-necked crane. The reserve has been designated as a Ramsar site since 2004.
