= Karzê Township, Lhünzhub County =

Kazi Township 卡孜乡
- Township
- Location in Tibet
- Coordinates: 29°54′03″N 91°10′24″E
- Country: People's Republic of China
- Region: Tibet
- Prefecture-level city: Lhasa
- County: Lhünzhub
- Elevation: 3,808 m (12,493 ft)
- Time zone: UTC+8 (China Standard)
- Area code: 0891

Kazi Township (simplified Chinese: 卡孜乡; traditional Chinese: 卡孜鄉; pinyin: Kǎzī Xiāng; Standard Tibetan: ???) is a township of Lhünzhub County, in east-central Tibet Autonomous Region, People's Republic of China, located 8.6 kilometres (5.3 mi) west of the county seat, and about 25 km (16 mi) north of the main urban area of Lhasa As of 2011, it has 6 villages under its administration.
