= Poindo Township =

Township in Lhasa, Tibet, China

Coordinates: 30°12′N 91°18′E

Poindo is a village and township in Lhünzhub, Lhasa in the Tibet Autonomous Region of China.

== See also ==
- List of towns and villages in Tibet
