= Chen Xiefen =

Chinese feminist, revolutionary and journalist

- 陳擷芬
- Born: 1883; Hengshan, Hunan Province, Qing dynasty
- Died: 1923 (aged 39–40)
- Occupation: Journalist
- Spouse: Yang Jun
- Parent: Chen Fan (陳範)

Chen Xiefen (Chinese: 陳擷芬; pinyin: chén xié fēn; Wade-Giles: ch'en hsieh fen; pen name: Chu‘nan nūzi; 1883 – 1923) was a Chinese feminist, revolutionary and journalist of the Qing era. She is regarded as one of the first progressive Chinese women to utilize the press to further women’s rights. From 1899 to 1903, Chen published Nübao magazine (later renamed Nüxuebao), where she advocated for women's education, gender equality and economic independence. After her magazine was banned in 1903, Chen Xiefen emigrated to Japan, where she briefly continued to print Nübao (now titled Nüxuebao). Chen Xiefen remained active in anti-Qing revolutionary circles until her fall from the public eye in 1911.

== Biography ==
=== Early life ===
Chen Xiefen was born in 1883 in Hengshan, Hunan Province, and was raised in Yanghu (currently Changzhou), Jiangsu Province. Chen Xiefen was born to a gentry-official family and was the oldest daughter of her household. Her father, Chen Fan (1860 – 1913), a demoted county magistrate and progressive intellectual, moved to Shanghai at the end of the 19th century. Upon settling in Shanghai, Chen Fan purchased and reformed the Subao (English: Jiangsu Daily) newspaper. Subao was a progressive, anti-Qing publication with radical intellectual Zhang Shizhao (1881 – 1973) as editor-in-chief.

The publication of Nübao (English: Women’s Journal), China’s first paper aimed at women, began on July 24, 1898. In 1899, at sixteen years old, Chen Xiefen took over Nübao with her father’s encouragement and assistance. During her initial years of working at Nübao, Chen Xiefen was a student at the missionary-run McTyeire Home and School for Girls. She quickly gained widespread recognition amongst fellow progressives for her personal essay contributions to the newspaper.

Between the years 1901 and 1902, Chen Xiefen aided her father and fellow reformists, including Cai Yuanpei (1868 – 1940), in the establishment of Aiguo nǚ xuexiao (English: Patriotic Girls' School). Aiguo nǚ xuexiao, which endorsed revolutionary activity, had an especially progressive and radical minded curriculum for the time. In early 1903, Chen Xiefen would form her own girls' school in Nübao's office.

=== Nübao (Nüxuebao) ===
Very soon after Chen Xiefen's arrival, Nübao was forced to cease operations due to government censorship. It would successfully return to publication on May 8, 1902. The issues spanning May 1902 to October 1903 are the only installments of Nübao which have been successfully recovered.

Nübao was originally offered as a free supplement to Subao. As an addition to the male-targeted publication, Nübaowas read by both men and women alike. In October 1902, Nübao was offered for sale as a distinct publication. This shift can be attributed to the New Policy Reform launched in the same year, during which reformers became especially interested in the topic of women’s education. It was distributed to major cities, including Beijing, Shanghai and Tianjin.

In June 1903, Subao was banned by the Qing government for its expression of anti-Qing sentiments. Fearful of government retribution, Chen Xiefen, her younger sister Chen Xinfang, and Chen Fan escaped to Tokyo, Japan where Chen Xiefen would resume the publication of Nübao under the name Nüxuebao (English: Women’s Studies Journal). Once in Tokyo, Chen Xiefen began publishing under the pseudonym Chu‘nan nūzi.

==== Content ====
Throughout its years of publication, Nübao (Nüxuebao) focused primarily on the promotion of women's education and rights. The paper originally served as an advocacy journal, with the advancement of women's rights, education and the abolition of foot binding at its core. However, following its independence from Subao in October 1902, its content diversified greatly. Its monthly issues began to feature "essays, speeches, letters, recent women's history, translated articles and poetry."

Chen Xiefen’s many editorials, wherein she expressed the newspaper’s feminist and progressive stance, include “Lun quan zhi chanzu zhi guanxi” (English: “An exhortation to cease footbinding”); “Yao you aiguo de xin” (English: “We must have patriotic minds”); “Buyao guoyu zhuangshi” (English: “Do not overdo it with adornment”); “Duli pian” (English: "On independence"); and “Lun nüzi yi jiang tiyu” (English: “Women need to discuss physical exercise”).

Under her new pseudonym, Chen Xiefen continued to communicate anti-Qing sentiment.

===== "Duli pian" =====
"Duli pian," published in 1903, is considered one of the earliest Chinese feminist writings produced by a woman. Chen Xiefen described the female body as a site of oppression, as evoked through the following excerpt:

Practices such as piercing the female ears for inserting metal earrings, and binding the female feet for marking the crippled sex, are manifestations of the elementary phase of the social law of corporal punishment (chuji xingfa). Those who refuse to be punished will be forced into submission, with cries of pain and tears of agony going unheard and unseen. The second phase of the social law of corporal punishment (ciji xingfa) is matchmaking that regards women’s own feelings as irrelevant. Wedded to strangers without any consideration for their feelings and wishes. When the promised husband dies before the marriage, the woman is forced to remain “widowed.” Let us not even talk about the servant girls, whose labor is enslaved and whose bodies are bought and sold like cows, horses, pigs, and chickens!

Chen Xiefen detailed the ways in which class informed the unjust treatment of women in traditional Chinese society. The female body is classified as “the crippled sex,” both in its physical disfigurement (“bound feet” and “pierced ears”) and in its eternal state of submission. “Duli pian” expressed Chen Xiefen’s belief that “the essence of independence (for women) … is the absence of interference and financial support from their male counterparts.” Once achieved, Chen Xiefen maintained that “there will be nothing women cannot study and no right that women cannot regain.”

===== "Lun nüzi yi jiang tiyu” =====
Published in 1903, “Lun nüzi yi jiang tiyu,” an editorial arguing the connection between physical culture and emancipation, was the first of its kind written by a Chinese woman. The article’s core message can be expressed through the following excerpt:

From today on, I want the pitiable worms who are my two million fellow womenfolk to change this situation themselves through becoming aware of it, and I want them to urge others to change it. People have to realize that without physical culture, there can be no beauty.

Chen Xiefen considered bodily awareness an emancipatory force. She articulated the need for greater autonomy over one’s body while urging women to establish their own definition of beauty. Aware of Chinese women’s internalization of mutilation as an acceptable societal value, Chen Xiefen wished to transform the precepts instilled in women from birth; solely unbinding one’s feet or removing one’s piercings would not be enough. Chen Xiefen's advocacy for the internal realization of female emancipation was a stance not commonly assumed by other reformers of her period.

=== Life in Japan ===
In Japan, Chen Xiefen remained a student, studying at Tokyo's Huazu Xuexiao (English: Chinese School), while acting as president of the student-run women's organization Gong Ai Hui (English: Mutual Love Society). Gong Ai Hui, an anarchic, anti-Qing sisterhood for female Chinese students in Japan, was the first organization of its kind. According to its mission statement, Gong Ai Hui aimed “to improve the status of China’s two hundred million women and to recuperate their natural rights, so that all women, imbued with concern for the nation, will be able to fulfill their responsibilities as citizens.” Alongside friends and fellow revolutionaries Qiu Jin (1875 – 1907) and Lin Zongsu (1878 – 1944), Chen Xiefen would work to further Gong Ai Hui’s agenda.

The many connections she formed through her editorial and activist work proved especially valuable during moments of hardship. Shortly after arriving in Tokyo, Chen Xiefen's father arranged for her entrance into a forced concubinage. With the support of Chinese female students in Tokyo and Qiu Jin, Chen Xiefen succeeded in resisting the proposal.

In 1905, Chen Xiefen joined politician and revolutionary Huang Xing’s (1874 – 1916) bomb-making organization where she assisted with uprising preparations alongside other revolutionaries.

Chen Xiefen continued her studies, transferring to Yokohama Public School for Christian Women, until meeting and marrying a Sichuan man named Yang Jun. Soon after marrying, she and her husband left Japan to study abroad in the United States. Following her return to China in 1911, Chen Xiefen joined the Shenzhou Nüjie Xiejishe (English: Association of Chinese Women). The organization advocated for women’s suffrage through a lens of nationalism and reform. Little else is known of Chen Xiefen’s political and professional activities after 1911.
