= Beijing This Month =

Chinese English language magazine

Beijing This Month (BTM) is a free monthly English language magazine, published in Beijing by the Beijing Foreign Cultural Exchanges Centre in association with the Beijing City Government.

== History and profile ==
The magazine's first issue appeared in 1994. Non-audited, self-reported circulation of 70,000 copies per month, the magazine can be found at Beijing hotels, office buildings, and cultural sites, indeed anywhere with large numbers of tourists, including Beijing Capital International Airport. Advertising is primarily of hotels, shows, and restaurants in central Beijing.

BTM primarily focuses on tourism and the promotion of Beijing. Being an arm of the Beijing Government, unusual or out-of-hours access to sensitive sites in the city (such as the Temple of Heaven or the Great Wall) is often arranged, and the magazine features high-quality photography of such places.

Issues are usually dedicated to a particular theme: the 2004 Olympic Torch Relay, China's eight major cuisines, and Beijing's many architectural styles, are examples from June, August, and September 2004, respectively.
