= Vestnik Manʹchzhurii =

Manchurian monthly economic journal

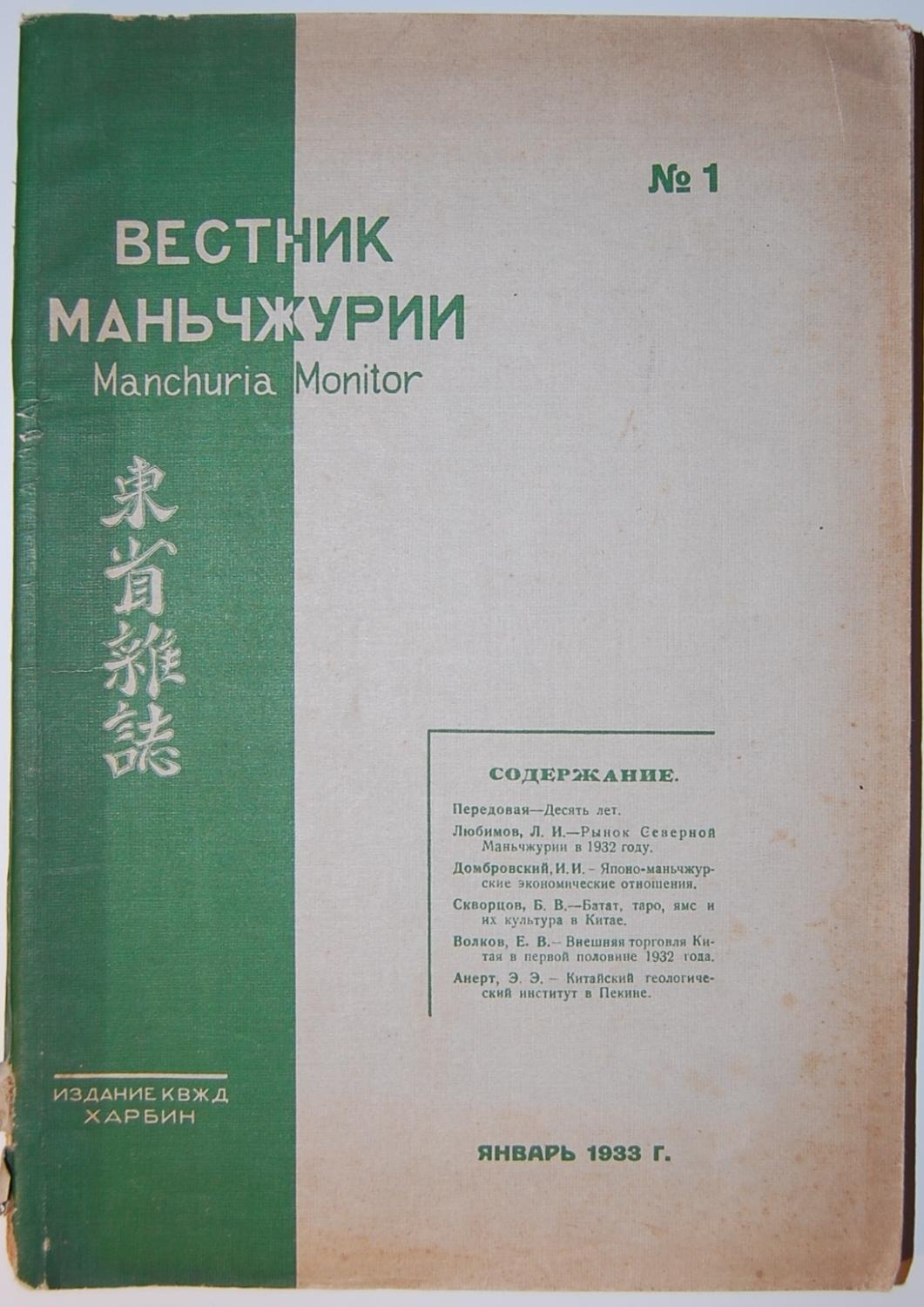
Вестник Маньчжурии

Vestnik Manʹchzhurii (Eng. Manchuria Monitor) was a monthly journal of the economy of Manchuria published from 1923 to 1930. The journal was published in Harbin in the Russian language with English summaries.
