= Free-living Amoebozoa infection =

- Specialty: Infectious disease

Free-living amoebae (or "FLA") are a group of protozoa that are important causes of infectious disease in humans and animals.

Naegleria fowleri is often included in the group "free-living amoebae", and this species causes a usually fatal condition traditionally called primary amoebic meningoencephalitis (PAM). However, the genus Naegleria is now considered part of the Excavata, not the Amoebozoa, and is considered to be much more closely related to Leishmania and Trypanosoma.

== Presentation ==
Acanthamoeba spp. causes mostly subacute or chronic granulomatous amoebic encephalitis (GAE), with a clinical picture of headaches, altered mental status, and focal neurologic deficit, which progresses over several weeks to death. In addition, Acanthamoeba spp. can cause granulomatous skin lesions and, more seriously, keratitis and corneal ulcers following corneal trauma or in association with contact lenses.

== Life cycle ==
Acanthamoeba spp. and Balamuthia mandrillaris are opportunistic free-living amoebae capable of causing granulomatous amoebic encephalitis (GAE) in individuals with compromised immune systems.

- Acanthamoeba spp. have been found in soil; fresh, brackish, and sea water; sewage; swimming pools; contact lens equipment; medicinal pools; dental treatment units; dialysis machines; heating, ventilating, and air conditioning systems; mammalian cell cultures; vegetables; human nostrils and throats; and human and animal brain, skin, and lung tissues.
- B. mandrillaris however, has not been isolated from the environment but has been isolated from autopsy specimens of infected humans and animals.

Unlike N. fowleri, Acanthamoeba and Balamuthia have only two stages, cysts and trophozoites, in their life cycle. No flagellated stage exists as part of the life cycle. The trophozoites replicate by mitosis (nuclear membrane does not remain intact) . The trophozoites are the infective forms and are believed to gain entry into the body through the lower respiratory tract, ulcerated or broken skin and invade the central nervous system by hematogenous dissemination . Acanthamoeba spp. and Balamuthia mandrillaris cysts and trophozoites are found in tissue.

== Diagnosis ==
In Acanthamoeba infections, the diagnosis can be made from microscopic examination of stained smears of biopsy specimens (brain tissue, skin, cornea) or of corneal scrapings, which may detect trophozoites and cysts. Cultivation of the causal organism, and its identification by direct immunofluorescent antibody, may also prove useful. Laboratory workers and physicians often mistake the organisms on wet mount for monocytes and a diagnosis of viral meningitis is mistakenly given if the organisms are not motile. Heating a copper penny with an alcohol lamp and placing it on the wet mount slide will activate sluggish trophozoites and more rapidly make the diagnosis. If the person performing the spinal tap rapidly looks at the heated wet mount slide the trophozoites can be seen to swarm while monocytes do not.

== Treatment ==
Eye and skin infections caused by Acanthamoeba spp. are generally treatable. Topical use of 0.1% propamidine isethionate (Brolene) plus neomycin-polymyxin B-gramicidin ophthalmic solution has been a successful approach; keratoplasty is often necessary in severe infections. Although most cases of brain (CNS) infection with Acanthamoeba have resulted in death, patients have recovered from the infection with proper treatment.

== Geographic distribution ==
While infrequent, infections appear to occur worldwide.

== See also ==
- Waterborne diseases
