= More Hangzhou =

Chinese magazine

MORE Hangzhou is the first magazine to be published by Hangzhou Passion Advertising Company Limited, (杭州派迅广告有限公司) a publishing and advertising company based in Hangzhou City, Zhejiang Province, People's Republic of China. Hangzhou Passion Advertising Company Limited has expanded and currently owns three monthly print magazines and three websites. The first magazine, entitled MORE Hangzhou, first published in December 2004, had a print run of 5,000 copies and whose main content was Hangzhou city entertainment listings and editorial articles about Hangzhou. MORE Suzhou was first published in September 2007 and MORE Chengdu in January 2008.

All three magazines are mainly English language distributed for free in public locations in and around the cities. Since local expatriates and English speaking business and leisure travelers are the main target audience, distribution points are usually hotels, bars, restaurants, hospitals and other venues frequented by travelers. There is also a not-for-free subscription service for readers unable to get to distribution points.

Listings are chosen by the editorial team based on perceived usefulness to expatriates and other English-speakers living and visiting the relevant cities. Included in each listing is a short review of the venue in English and contact details in English and Chinese. The events section lists future events for the month, categorized by type: Restaurant, Nightlife, Arts and others. Readers are able to advertise in the Classifieds section and learn of places of interest in Hot Spot. The centre pages are a pull-out bilingual map of the city showing many of the listed venues.

The MORE Hangzhou Magazine is published under number CN 46-1042/F.

MORE maintains three websites, one for each of the cities with a print magazine. The first website, for Hangzhou, went live in summer 2006. The websites include mostly feature articles, up-to-date event listings and an expanded venue listings. Each listing provides a forum for users to provide their own feedback on events and venues.

The operation of the company is funded by advertising sales. Due to the complexities of learning to communicate in Chinese for non-Chinese speakers, the magazines and websites have been a useful tool for companies otherwise unable to reach non-Chinese speakers using usual advertising channels in China.
