= China Policy Review =

- Categories: Political magazine
- Frequency: Monthly
- Publisher: Development Research Center of the State Council
- Country: China
- Based in: Beijing
- Language: Chinese

China Policy Review (CPR), formerly known as China Economic Report, is a monthly magazine of the Development Research Center of the State Council. It was originally designed as an internal economic report for the State Council to disperse ideas and opinion throughout government, but since January 2006 it has been circulated to the public. The current circulation of the periodical is roughly 100,000 issues per month. Members of the editorial board of CPR include top Chinese economists and decision-makers. It mainly covers issues of China's economy, policy, politics, international relations, technology, and culture.

Numerous former national leaders, ministers, professors and other experts have been featured in previous issues of CPR, including: Nobel Prize Laureate Edmund S. Phelps; Futurist John Nesbitt; Guinean President Alpha Condé; and Deputy Central Bank Governor of Japan Kiyohiko Nishimura.

== Major sections ==
- Macroeconomy and finance
- Business and industry
- Public policy
- Regional focus
- International
- Innovation and China
- Culture
