= Codoi Township =

Chundui Township 春堆乡
- Township
- Location in Tibet
- Coordinates: 29°55′56″N 91°01′24″E
- Country: People's Republic of China
- Region: Tibet
- Prefecture-level city: Lhasa
- County: Lhünzhub
- Elevation: 3,950 m (12,960 ft)
- Time zone: UTC+8 (China Standard)
- Area code: 0891

Chundui (Chinese: 春堆; pinyin: Chūnduī; Standard Tibetan: མཚོ་སྟོད་) is a township in Lhünzhub County, Tibet Autonomous Region, People's Republic of China, about 30 km (19 mi) north of the urban area of Lhasa. It comprises three villages: Chunduicun (春堆村), Kadongcun (卡东村), and Luobaduicun (洛巴堆村).
