= Tbjhome =

China's Lifestyle English Magazine

- Publisher: China Intercontinental Press
- Editor: Simon Ostheimer
- Founded: 2006; 20 years ago
- Language: English
- Headquarters: Chaoyang District; Beijing, People's Republic of China
- Circulation: 44,000
- Price: Free

tbjhome is China's only English-language magazine covering lifestyle, design and architecture.
