= Metallurgy Analysis =

Monthly Chinese science magazine

Metallurgical analysis (冶金分析, in Chinese) is a monthly science magazine based in Beijing, China. The magazine was founded in 1981. It is owned by Central Research Institute of Iron and Steel of China (中国钢铁研究总院). The publisher is the metallurgical analysis editorial department. The magazine mostly features articles on the chemical analysis.

== Topics covered ==
- Detecting and monitoring techniques for production process control
- Sampling and sample preparation
- On-line analysis and control
- Surface and coating analysis
- Health and environmental analysis
- Quality control and laboratory management
- Advanced reviews on different fields of material analysis & testing techniques
- Standardization, certification, accreditation and verification.

In determining the suitability of submitted articles for publication, particular scrutiny will be placed on the degree of novelty and significance of the research and the extent to which it adds to existing knowledge in material analysis.
