= Xueren =

Chinese intellectual journal

Xueren (Chinese: 学人; lit. 'The Scholar') was an Chinese-language independent intellectual journal that ran from 1991 to 2000. It was founded and edited by Chen Pingyuan, Wang Hui, and Wang Shouchang under the sponsorship of a Japanese foundation. In order to work around censorship conditions in the Chinese publishing industry that make it more difficult for periodicals to get approval than books, Xueren was published as a "series" in the latter format. Other journals that have taken the same approach include Res Publica and Horizons.

Scholar Chaohua Wang locates Xueren's origins in "the self-examination of intellectuals intimately involved in the ferment of the eighties":

The project of its editors [. . .] was to retrieve the history of modern Chinese scholarship (xueshu shi), a tradition they felt was in danger of being obscured or forgotten under the pressure of imported theories. In doing so, they wanted to clarify their own intellectual identity and responsibilities. What was their position in a historical chain of scholarly development? When and how should a scholar speak out on public issues?

Co-founder Wang Hui characterizes his and his colleagues' motivations similarly, but without a critical approach toward "imported theories" in academe as a primary component of their intellectual project, and with more of an eye toward directly socially relevant goals. According to him, Xueren was created to facilitate an effort by young intellectuals to "reconsider" modern Chinese history in the wake of the failure of the 1989 democracy movement, a "process of reflection" that

included serious reconsideration of modern history, conscientious rethinking of attempts to carry out radical reform on the basis of Western models, close investigation of the Chinese historical legacy and its contemporary significance, and necessary critiques of certain of the consequences of radical political action.

However, Wang Hui states that Xueren "did not pursue any particular academic agenda."

== Example table of contents ==
The 648-page seventh issue of Xueren (May 1995) printed the following table of contents in English (though all articles were in Chinese):

Page	Title	Author
1	On Kant's Cultural Philosophy	Hong Qian
5	Hong Qian: A Rational Life	Wang Wei
15	Hong Qian and Otto Neurath	Fan Dainan
31	Mority Schlik on Content and Form	Han Linhe
43	A Commentary on the Eastern Flow of Western Geography During the Late Qing	Guo Shaunglin
85	Translingual Practice: The Discourse of Individualism Between China and the West	Lydia H. Liu
121	Cai Yuanpei's Philosophy of Gender Equality	Xia Xiaohong
163	Liu Shipei's Research on Chinese Academic History	Wu Guangxing
187	The Issues Raised During the Debate Between Xiong Shili and Liang Shuming	Jing Haifeng
211	The Vijñānavāda School and the Concept of Hetu	Luo Zhao
271	A New Look at the Origins of Tibetan Culture	Wang Xiaodun
303	A Study of the Dagger-Axe with the "Bi bing" Inscriptions Found at Jingmen	Luo Zhao
325	The Mo Sword and the Military Affairs of the Great Tang Empire	Li Jinxiu
341	The Bagu Eight-Part Essay and Classical Chinese Prose of the Ming and Qing	Chen Pingyuan
373	On the Adherents of the Ming Dynasty	Zhao Yuan
395	On the Relationship Between Changzhou 常州 Woman's Culture and the Yanghu School Writers 阳湖派	Cao Hong
419	In Search of New Models for Research on China	Liu Dong
469	Reaching Out From Tradition: The Connection Between Peace and Political Order	He Huaihong
501	The Fate of the Doctrine of Two Categories of Truth: From the Seventeenth Century to the Present	Xu Youyu
523	Theory and Practice: A Study of the History of Philosophical Thinking	Zhang Rulun
561	Song See Yeol and the Zhuzi School of the Lee Dynasty in Korea	Chen Lai
577	Ogyu Sorai and His Innovations to Japanese Confucianism	Wang Zonghiangz
	Notes on Academic History Research	
601	Breaking Away Form [sic] the Cycle of the Han and Song Schools	Chen Shaoming
615	A Brief Account of the Revival of the Xunzi School During the Mid-Qing	Yang Hu
627	A Critique of Xiao Yang's "The Law of Causality, Historicism, and Autonomy"	Chen Lian

== See also ==
- Dushu, a journal of which Wang Hui would become editor in 1996, and which had been in the mid-to-late eighties a key popularizer of the "imported theories" to which Xueren's founding was in part a reaction
