= Pengbo River =

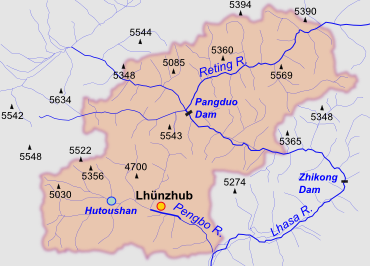
- Pengbo River is in the southwest of Lhünzhub County
- Native name: Chinese: 澎波河

Location
- Country: China
- Autonomous region: Tibet
- Prefecture-level city: Lhasa
- County: Lhünzhub

Physical characteristics
- Mouth
  - coordinates: 29.780649°N 91.431094°E

Pengbo River
- Chinese: 澎波河
Transcriptions
Standard Mandarin
- Hanyu Pinyin: Péngbō Hé
- Wade–Giles: P‘eng-po Ho

The Pengbo River is a tributary of the Lhasa River that runs through the western part of Lhünzhub County, Lhasa municipality, Tibet, China.

== Location ==
The Pengbo River is one of the main tributaries of the Lhasa River, located in Lhünzhub County. The river valley holds the Hutoushan Reservoir, the largest reservoir in Tibet, with total storage of 12,000,000 cubic metres (420,000,000 cu ft).

== Environment ==
There are three natural forests in the river basin. A 2013 report said that although the Lhasa Municipal Forestry Bureau was undertaking an extensive afforestation program, half of the seedlings planted along the Peng Po river died in the dry season due to sandy soil and lack of water. The valley is home to black-necked cranes, who spend their nights on Hutoushan Reservoir during the winter, foraging in the farmland in the day. A protected area of 96.8 square kilometres (37.4 sq mi) has been established for the black-necked cranes. In 1996 there were about 4,000 of the birds, most of whom spent their winters in the valleys of the Nyanga, Lhasa and Pengbo rivers and the middle reaches of the Yarlung Tsangpo.

== Irrigation ==
The river basin contains 14,924 hectares (36,880 acres) of farmland, of which 9,333 hectares (23,060 acres) could be irrigated. The Pengbo Basin receives less than 400 millimetres (16 in) of precipitation annually. A 1995 report concluded that water deficiency in the Pengbo basin was very high, particularly during the growing season from March to May, and was expected to become worse. The report recommended building a canal from Zhikong, running along the right bank of the Lhasa River for 105 kilometres (65 mi) to transfer water to the Pengbo basin for irrigation of 6,000 hectares (15,000 acres). In 2013 a spokesman for the Lhasa City Water Conservancy Bureau said the Peng Po Northern Irrigation canal project would be started that year.
