= Chinaplas =

Plastics and rubber trade fair in China

CHINAPLAS (Chinese: 中国国际塑料橡胶工业展览会) is the world's leading international plastics and rubber trade fair in Asia.

== History ==
CHINAPLAS is currently the world's leading international trade fair for the plastics and rubber industries, and also widely recognized by the industry as one of the most influential exhibitions in the world. Its significance is surpassed only by K Fair in Germany, the world's premier plastics and rubber trade fair.

The exhibition was founded in 1983. CHINAPLAS has become a sourcing and networking platform for the plastics and rubber industries and has contributed to their development.

CHINAPLAS has been certified as a "UFI Approved International Event" by [Union des Foires Internationales], the Global Association of the Exhibition Industry. Since 1987, CHINAPLAS has gained sustained support from EUROMAP European Committee of Machinery Manufacturers for the Plastics & Rubber Industries as the Sponsor.

=== Upcoming edition CHINAPLAS 2027 ===
- Date: April 13–16, 2027
- Venue: Shenzhen World Exhibition & Convention Center (Bao'an), PR China
- CHINAPLAS 2027 will be held at the Shenzhen World Exhibition & Convention Center (Bao'An), PR China, on April 13-16, 2027 under the theme of “Advancing a Smarter, Circular Future - As One”. With an exhibition area of 390,000 square meters, 8 national/regional pavilions, and 16 theme zones, the event shall feature more than 4,700 renowned exhibitors from about 40 countries and regions. By connecting industry players, innovators, and decision-makers, the exhibition creates a high-quality platform for technology and trade exchange spanning the entire industrial chain from plastics and rubber raw materials to machinery and end-use applications, helping enterprises capture market opportunities ahead of the curve.

=== Past edition CHINAPLAS 2026 ===
- Date: April 21–24, 2026
- Venue: National Exhibition and Convention Center (NECC), Hongqiao, Shanghai, PR China

==== Show Scale of CHINAPLAS 2026 ====
- Exhibition Area: 390,000+ sqm
- No. of International Exhibitors: 5,104
- No. of Material Exhibitors: 1,900+
- 8 Country/Region Pavilions: Austria, France, Germany, Italy, Japan, Switzerland, UK, & Taiwan Region (China)
- 17 Theme Zones
- No. of visitors: 350,189

Machine Exhibits

- Auxiliary & Testing Equipment Zone
- Blow Molding & Thermoforming Machinery Zone
- Die & Mould Zone
- Extrusion Machinery Zone
- Film Tech Zone
- Injection Molding & Smart Manufacturing Solutions Zone
- Flexible Plastic Packaging Machinery Zone
- Recycling Tech Zone
- Rubber Machinery Zone

Material Suppliers

- Additives Zone
- Bioplastics Zone
- Chemicals & Raw Materials Zone
- Colour Pigment & Masterbatch Zone
- Composites & High Performance Materials Zone
- Recycled Plastics Zone
- Thermoplastic Elastomers & Rubber Zone

Innovative Products Zone

=== Past edition CHINAPLAS 2025 ===
- Date: April 15–18, 2025
- Venue: Shenzhen World Exhibition & Convention Center (Bao'an), Shenzhen, PR China

Show Scale of CHINAPLAS 2025

- Exhibition Area: 380,000 sqm
- No. of International Exhibitors: 4,300
- No. of Material Suppliers: 1,600+
- No. of Machine Exhibits: 3,800+
- 9+ Country/Region Pavilions: Austria, France, Germany, Italy, Japan, Switzerland, UK, US, & Taiwan Region (China)
- 17 Theme Zones
- No. of visitors: 281,206

== Events ==
- CHINAPLAS 2026 (The 38th International Exhibition on Plastics and Rubber Industries) - 21–24 April 2026, National Exhibition and Convention Center (NECC), Hongqiao, Shanghai, PR China
- CHINAPLAS 2025 (The 37th International Exhibition on Plastics and Rubber Industries) - 15–18 April 2025, Shenzhen World Exhibition & Convention Center, PR China
- CHINAPLAS 2024 (The 36th International Exhibition on Plastics and Rubber Industries) - 23–26 April 2024, Shanghai National Exhibition & Convention Center, PR China
- CHINAPLAS 2023 (The 35th International Exhibition on Plastics and Rubber Industries) - 17–20 April 2023, Shenzhen World Exhibition & Convention Center, PR China
- CHINAPLAS 2022 (The 35th International Exhibition on Plastics and Rubber Industries) - 25–28 April 2022, Shanghai National Exhibition & Convention Center, PR China
- CHINAPLAS 2021 (The 34th International Exhibition on Plastics and Rubber Industries) - 13–16 April 2021, Shenzhen World Exhibition & Convention Center(SWECC), PR China
- CHINAPLAS 2020 (The 34th International Exhibition on Plastics and Rubber Industries) - 21–24 April 2020, National Exhibition and Convention Center, Hongqiao, Shanghai, PR China
- CHINAPLAS 2019 (The 33rd International Exhibition on Plastics and Rubber Industries) - 21–24 May 2019, China Import & Export Fair Complex, Pazhou, Guangzhou, PR China
- CHINAPLAS 2018 (The 32nd International Exhibition on Plastics and Rubber Industries) - 24–27 April 2018, National Exhibition and Convention Center, Hongqiao (NECC), Shanghai, PR China
- CHINAPLAS 2017 (The 31st International Exhibition on Plastics and Rubber Industries) - 16–19 May 2017, China Import and Export Fair Pazhou Complex, Pazhou, Guangzhou, PR China
- CHINAPLAS 2016 (The 30th International Exhibition on Plastics and Rubber Industries) - 25–28 April 2016, Shanghai New International Expo Centre (SNIEC), PR China
- CHINAPLAS 2015 (The 29th International Exhibition on Plastics and Rubber Industries) - 20–23 May 2015, China Import and Export Fair Pazhou Complex, Pazhou, Guangzhou, PR China
- CHINAPLAS 2014 (The 28th International Exhibition on Plastics and Rubber Industries) - 23–26 April 2014, Shanghai New International Expo Centre (SNIEC), PR China
- CHINAPLAS 2013 (The 27th International Exhibition on Plastics and Rubber Industries) - 20–23 May 2013, China Import and Export Fair Pazhou Complex, Pazhou, Guangzhou, PR China
