= That's =

English-language magazines in China

That's is a brand name used by a set of English-language listings magazines in the People's Republic of China. They were owned by Shanghai-based publishing group, Urbanatomy Media; as of May 2020, the publisher was JY International Cultural Communications. The China "That's" brand was started by Mark Kitto in 1998. That's magazines are now the biggest English magazines in Guangzhou, Shanghai, Beijing, and Shenzhen.

The magazines are That's Beijing, That's Shanghai, That's PRD, That's Shenzhen and That's Guangzhou.

== That's Beijing ==
- That's Beijing's 5th-year anniversary cover
- Publisher: China Intercontinental Press
- Founded: 2001
- Language: English
- Headquarters: Beijing, People's Republic of China
- ISSN: 1672-8025
- Website: thatsmags.com/beijing

That's Beijing is a monthly English language magazine, distributed throughout Beijing, with a focus on news, current events, culture, art, music, fashion, nightlife and dining in Beijing.

== That's Shanghai ==
That's Shanghai is a monthly English-language listings and entertainment magazine published in China. As of May 2020, the print magazine had a staff of 30 and a circulation of 62,500 with 40 percent of its readership being expatriates.

== That's GBA ==
That's GBA is an English-language magazine published in Guangzhou and Shenzhen in the Greater Bay Area, Southern China.

It was created in 1997 under the name Clueless in Guangzhou, that's PRD. PRD stands for "Pearl River Delta". In January 2020, the magazine said goodbye to the That’s PRD moniker (which they’d published under for the past 13 years) and adopted the name That’s GBA to reflect their local coverage and the political and societal changes that have occurred in the region.
