= China Intercontinental Communication Center =

Chinese state media entity

- Type: State-owned
- Headquarters: Beijing, China
- Area served: Worldwide
- Key people: Dong Qing (CEO)
- Website: cicc.org.cn

The China Intercontinental Communication Center (Chinese: 五洲传播中心), also known as the China International Communication Center, or CICC, (Note: Other alternate names include China Intercontinental Press or China International Press (Chinese: 五洲传播出版社) and China Intercontinental Press Media (Chinese: 五洲传播出版传媒).) is a Chinese state media entity operated by the Central Propaganda Department of the Chinese Communist Party.

== History and content ==
The CICC was founded in 1993 with the stated aim of "letting the world understand China and letting China understand the world". One of its principal activities is co-producing documentaries and television shows with foreign broadcasters, including in Western and other Asian countries. Such productions have been described as often containing Chinese state messaging and propaganda. The CICC also publishes books and organizes international cultural exchange activities.

The CICC operates several websites and publications, including:

- State Council Information Office website
- Humanrights.cn, the China Society for Human Rights Studies website
- Chinaxinjiang.cn
- Tibetol.cn
- China News Release
- City Walk magazines (That's magazines in English)
