= Gafencu Men =

Chinese men's magazine

Gafencu Men is a monthly men's lifestyle magazine published in Hong Kong and mainland China.

Gafencu Men was established in 2007. The magazine is published by Total Media on a monthly basis. It has two language editions: English edition for Hong Kong and Mandarin Chinese for China. Its target audience is affluent Chinese men and business professionals. Since 2009, the magazine has presented the Best of the Best Awards.
