= Nübao =

Defunct women's magazine in China (1898–1903)

Nübao (lit. 'Women’s Journal') was a Chinese-language magazine. Established in 1898, it was one of China’s first women's magazines. The founder was Chen Xiefen, a Chinese feminist and journalist of the Qing era. The magazine had five goals:

- Abolishing foot binding
- Educating girls
- Freeing marriage
- Jobs for women
- Equality with men.

The headquarters of Nübao was in Shanghai. The magazine was closed by the Chinese government in 1903 due to its anti-government stance.
