= South Reviews =

- Cover of the 12 February 2024 issue
- Founded: April 1985
- Based in: Guangzhou
- Website: www.nfcmag.com
- ISSN: 1004-0641
- OCLC: 958417885

South Reviews (simplified Chinese: 南风窗; traditional Chinese: 南風窗; pinyin: Nánfēng Chuāng; lit. 'South Wind Window') is a centre-left biweekly politics and economics magazine based in Guangzhou, China. A subsidiary of Guangzhou Daily Press Group (广州日报报业集团), the magazine was established in April 1985. With a circulation of 660,000 copies per issue, it is the most popular magazine covering politics and economics in China.

In July 2011, the magazine published an interview with Taiwanese historian Tang Chi-hua. Upon this, the president and editor of the magazine removed from the posts.

== See also ==
- List of magazines in China
