= Bosom Friend =

Chinese women's magazine

- Editor-in-chief: Hu Xunbi
- Categories: Celebrity magazines; Women's magazines
- Frequency: Three times per month
- Publisher: Bosom Friend Publishing
- Founder: Hu Xunbi
- Founded: 1985; 40 years ago
- Company: Bosom Friend Publishing Group
- Country: China
- Based in: Wuhan
- Language: Chinese
- ISSN: 1000-4157
- OCLC: 33019940

Bosom Friend (Chinese: 知音) is a Chinese language bimonthly celebrity and women's magazine published in Wuhan, China. The magazine is among the leading titles in the country. The title of the magazine is a reference to the idiom "bosom friend" which means a very close friend.

== History and profile ==
Bosom Friend was established in Wuhan in 1985. The magazine is part of Bosom Friend Publishing Group. As of 2004 its publisher was the Hubei Women's Federation. Its publisher is Bosom Friend Publishing.

During its early period Bosom Friend was published monthly and then biweekly. Later it appeared on a bimonthly basis. Later its frequency was switched to three times per month.

Bosom Friend was described by Chen Peiqin as aiming at lonely and undereducated Chinese housewives as well as elderly people living in small towns. Hu Xunbi is both the founder and the editor-in-chief of the magazine, who launched its Hong Kong edition in 2005.

== Circulation ==
Bosom Friend had a circulation of 1.7 million copies in 1987. In 1994 it was the sixth largest magazine by advertisement revenue in China. The circulation of the magazine was 1,280,000 copies in 1996.

The magazine sold 4,269,000 copies in 2000. In 2001 it was the fifth best-selling general interest magazine worldwide with a circulation of 4,230,000 copies. In 2003 Bosom Friend was the third best-selling magazine in China and its circulation was 2,450,000 copies. In 2006 it was the largest fourteenth magazine worldwide with a circulation of 2,500,000 copies. In January 2010 the magazine sold 3,150,000 copies.
