= Lawa La =

High mountain pass in central Bhutan

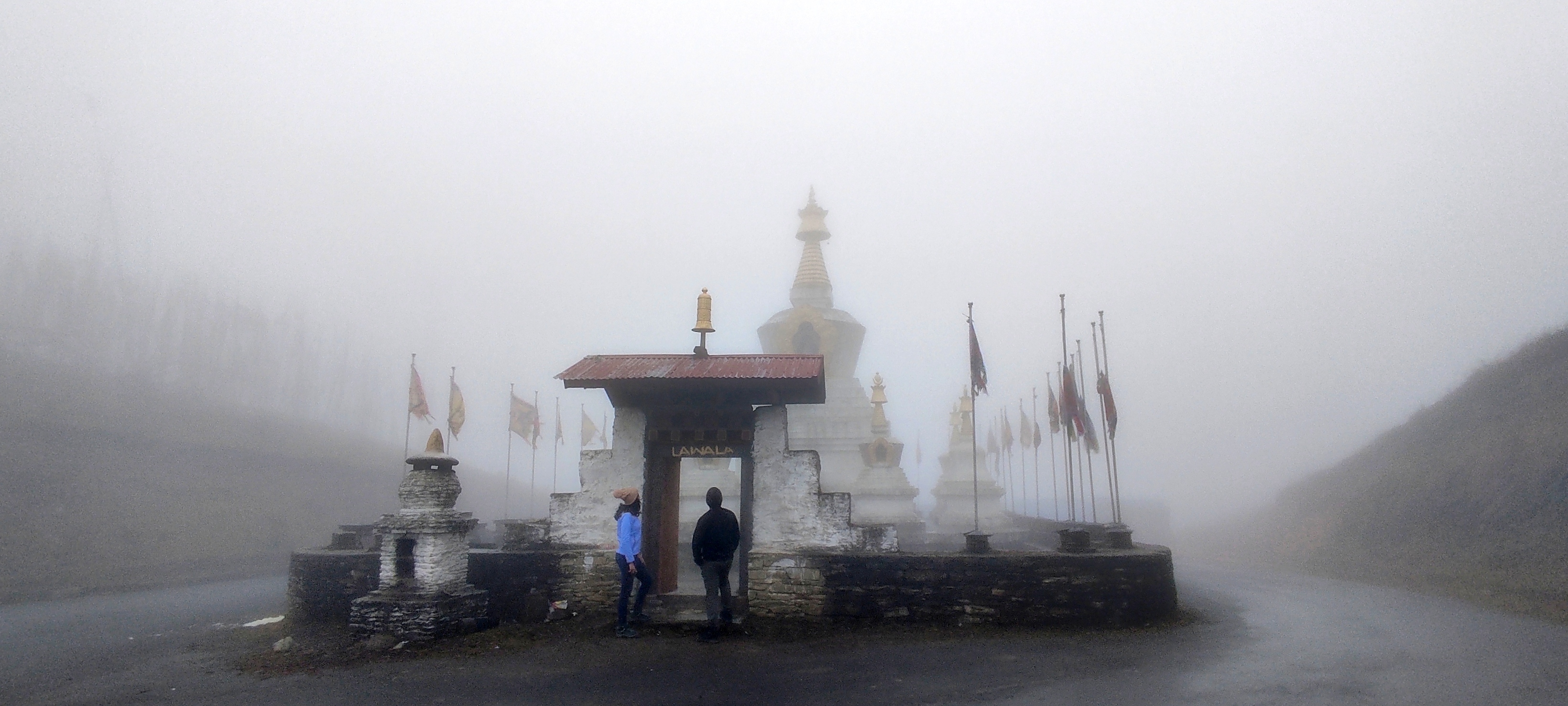
- Chorten's gate at Lawala Pass, c. March 2023

- Location within Bhutan
- Elevation: 3,250 metres (10,660 ft)

Third Approach
- Range: Himalayas
- Coordinates: 27°31′29.04″N 90°10′20.25″E

Lawa La (Lawa Pass, la means pass in Dzongkha) is a high-mountain motorable pass located in Bhutan.

== Location ==
Situated in the western-central part of Bhutan at an altitude of 3,250 m (10,660 ft), it serves as an important route connecting the districts of Punakha District and Trongsa District.

A little over 3 kilometers (approximately 1.8 miles) prior to reaching Pele La, there exists a secluded road that directs towards this mountain pass. This pass serves as an entranceway to the Phobjikha Valley.

== Gallery ==
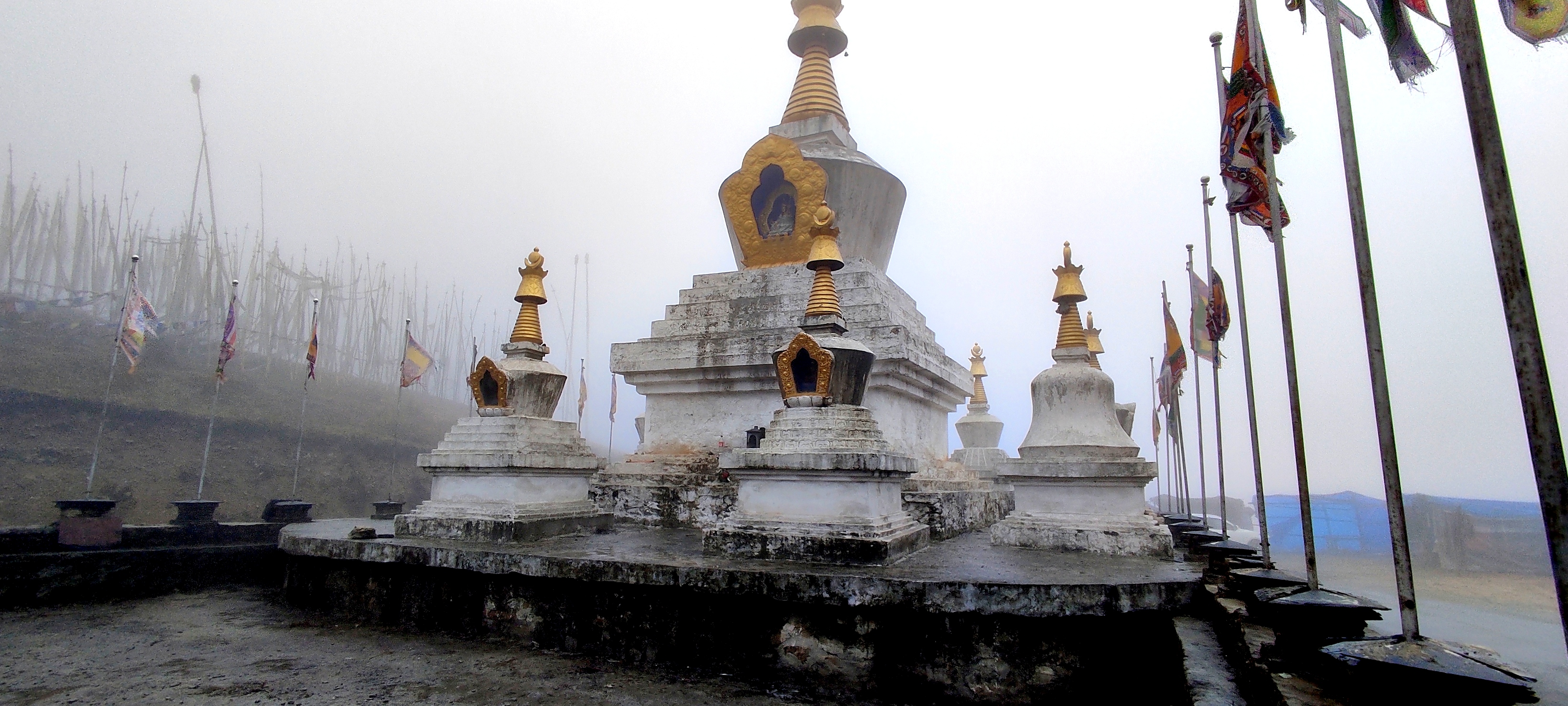
Chorten at Lawa La Pass in Central Bhutan, c. March 2023

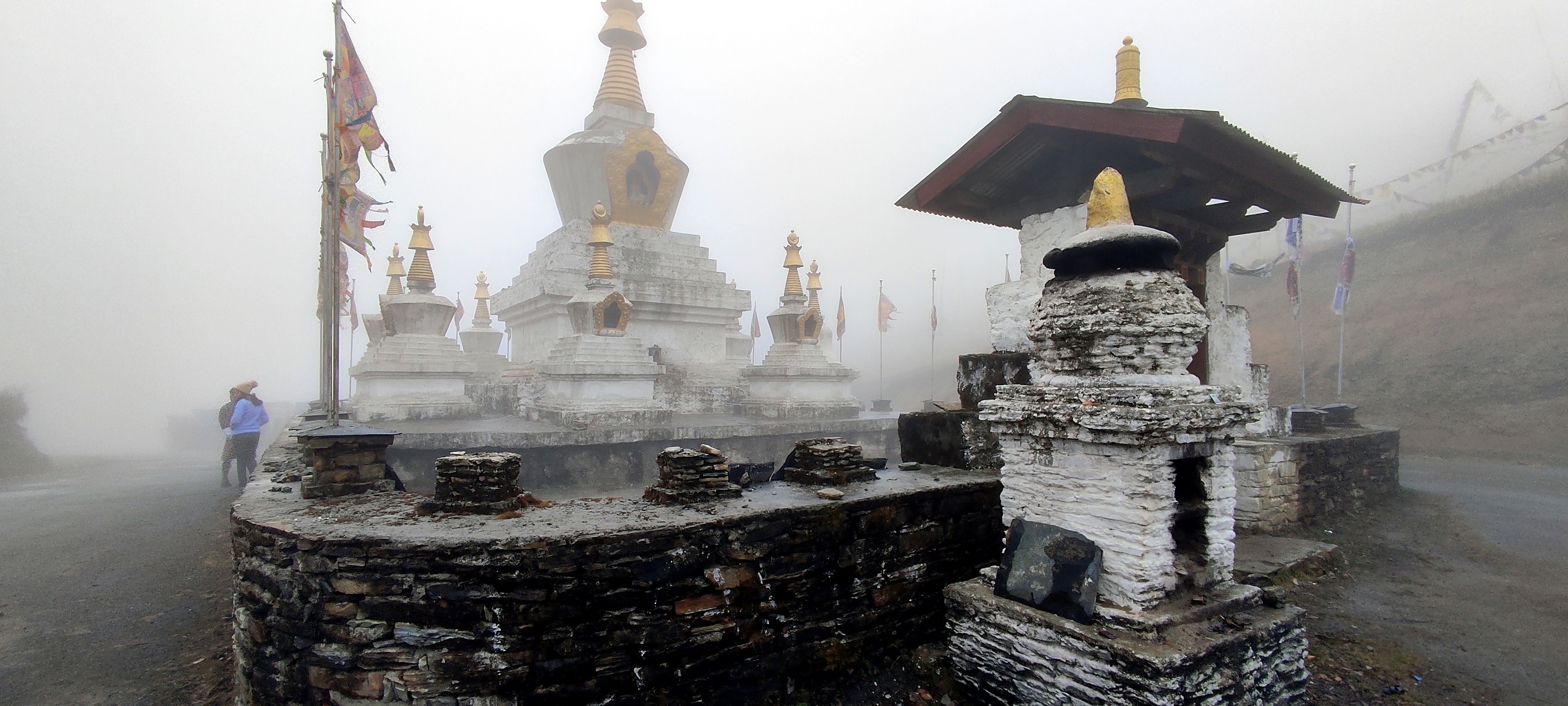
Left-side view of the Chorten at Lawa La Pass in Central Bhutan, c. March 2023

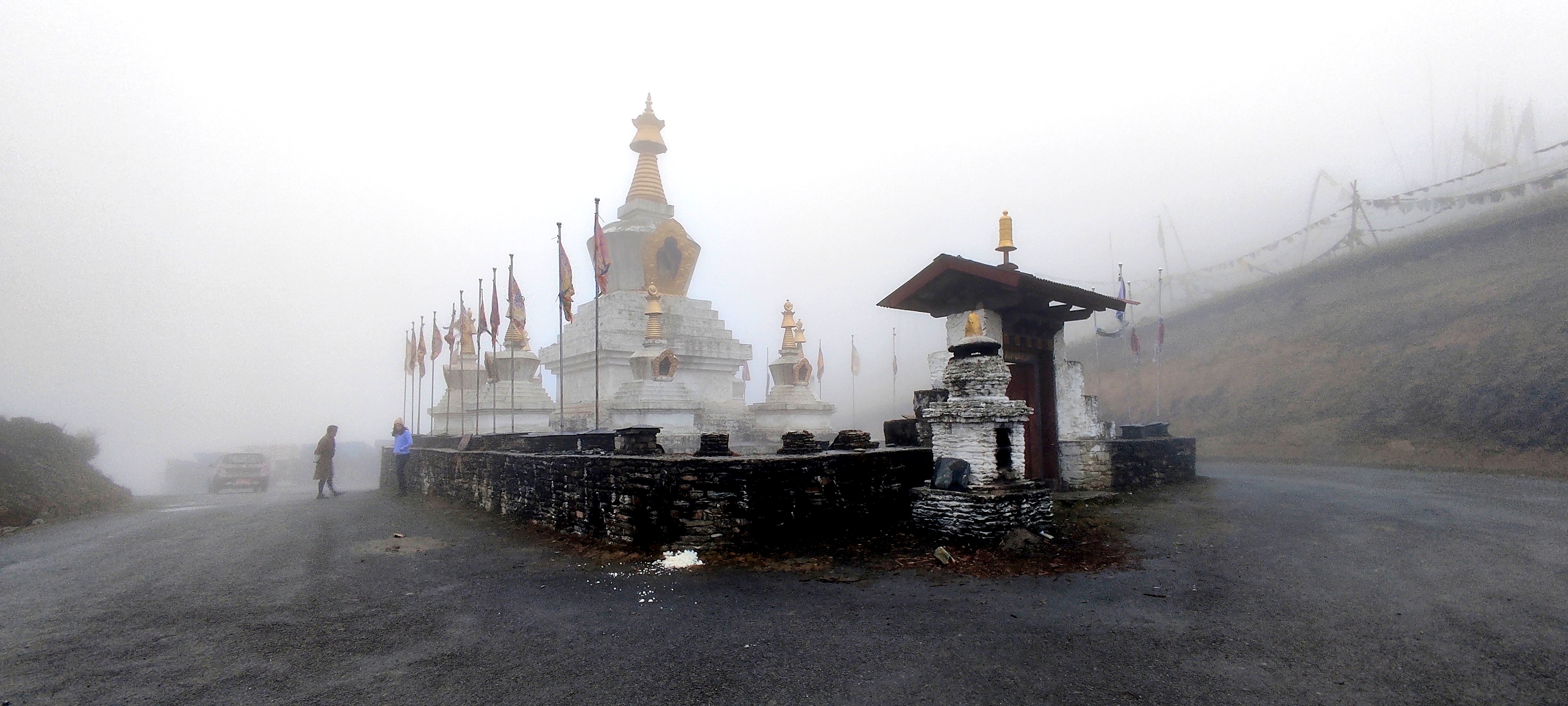
Wide-angle view of the Chorten at Lawa La Pass in Central Bhutan, c. March 2023

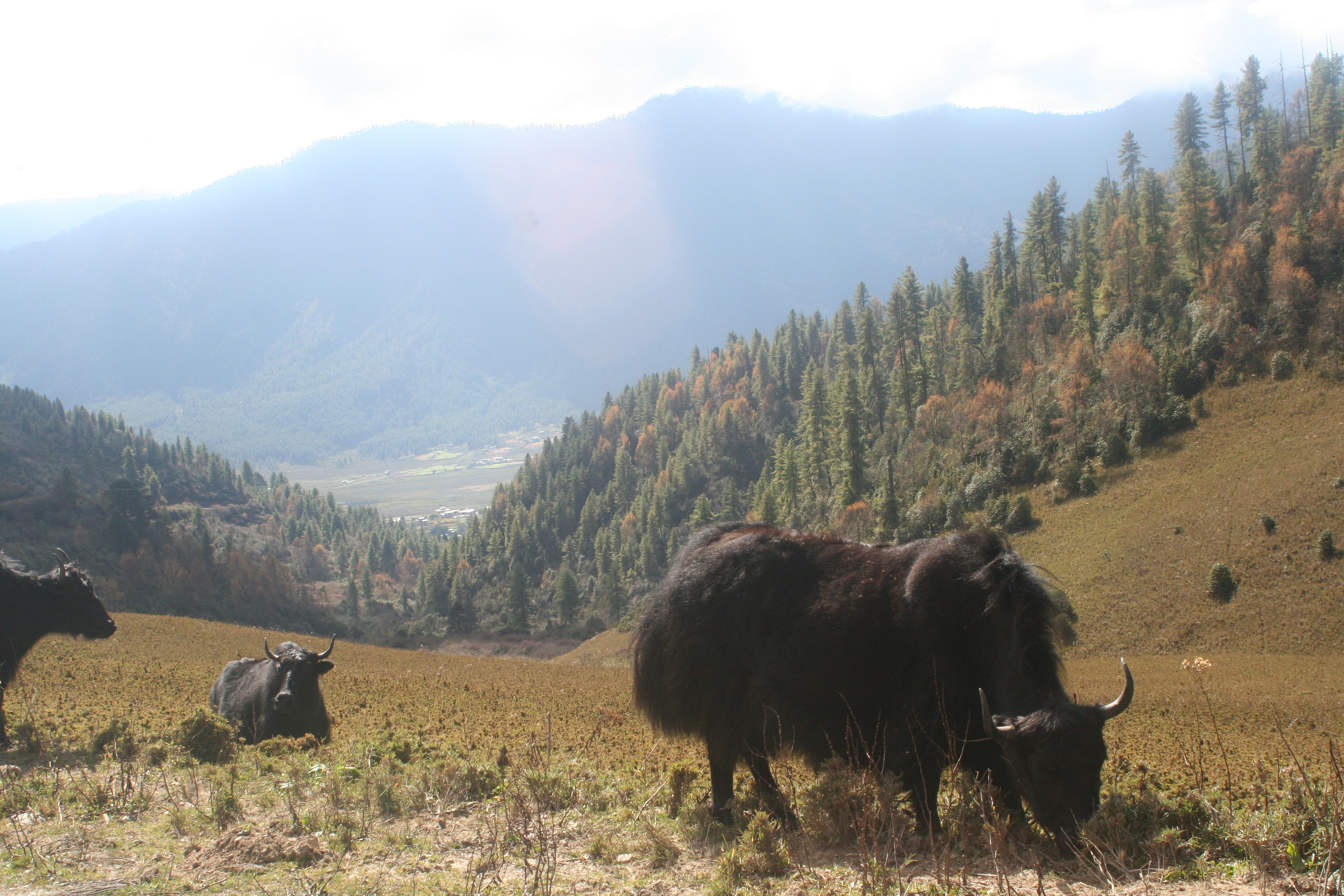
Yaks at the Lawala Pass

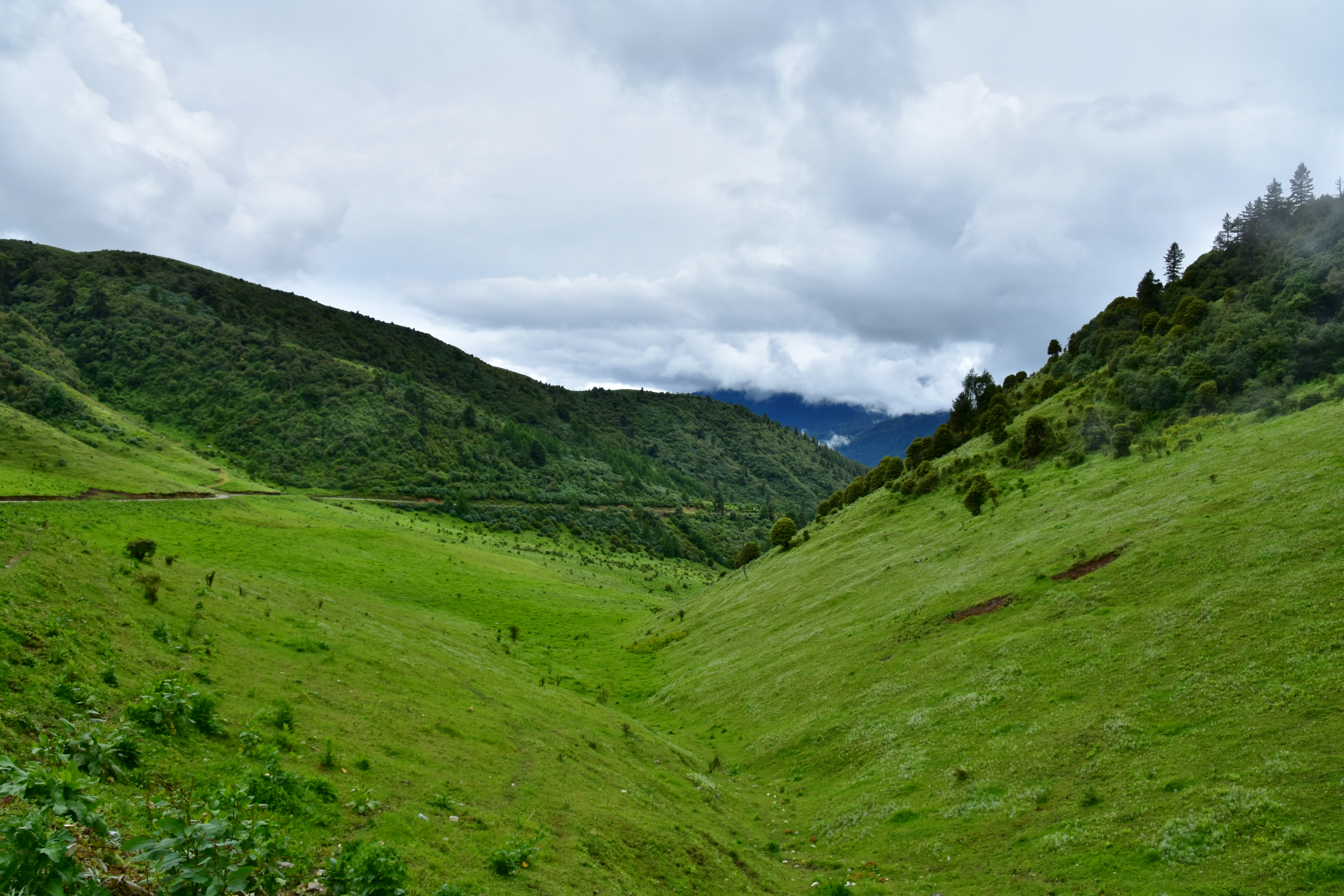
Green meadows below Lawala Pass

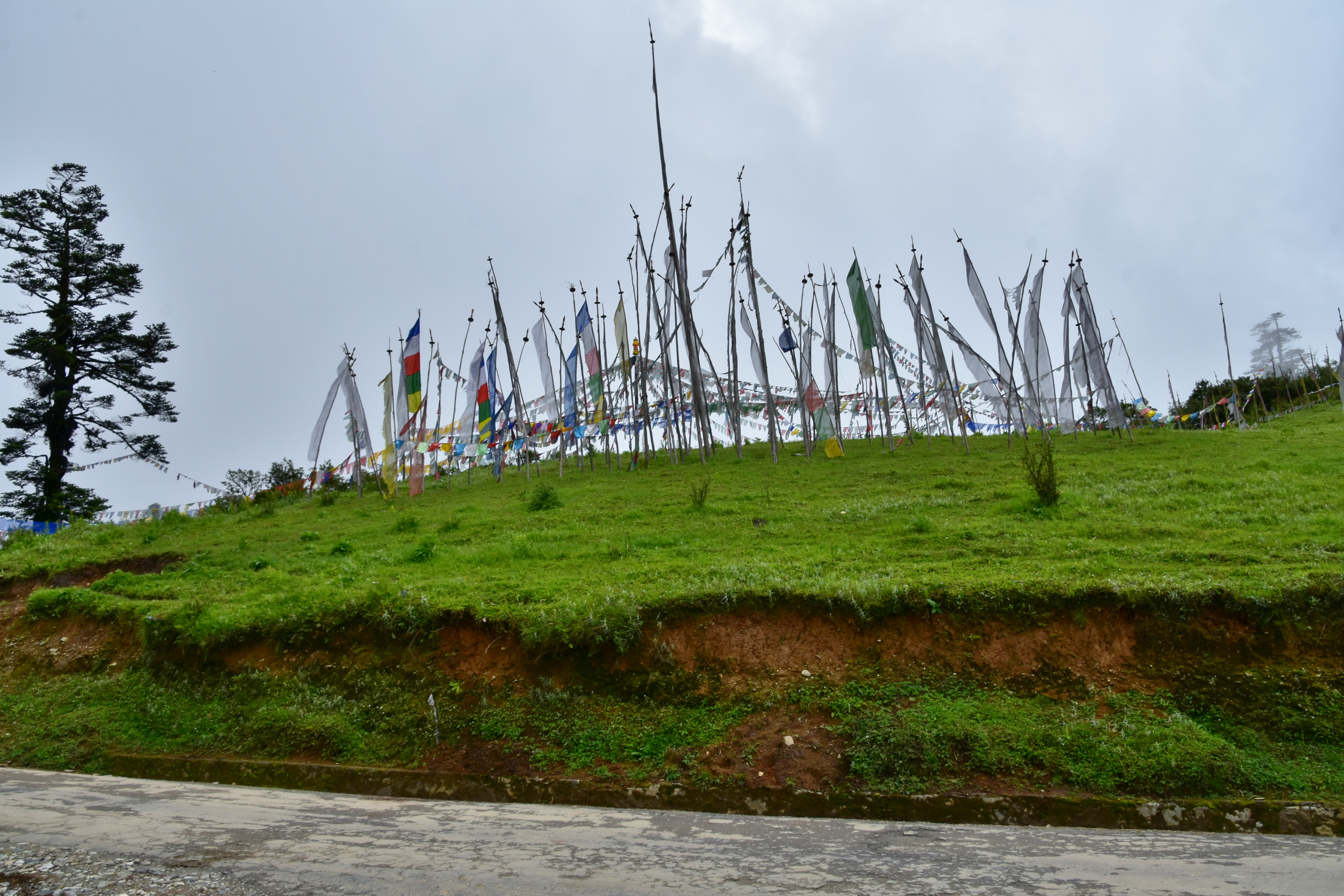
Prayer flags near the pass

== See also ==
- Black Mountains (Bhutan)
- Phobjikha Valley
- Trans Bhutan Trail
- Thrumshing La
- Chelela Pass
