= Phobjikha Valley =

Valley in Bhutan

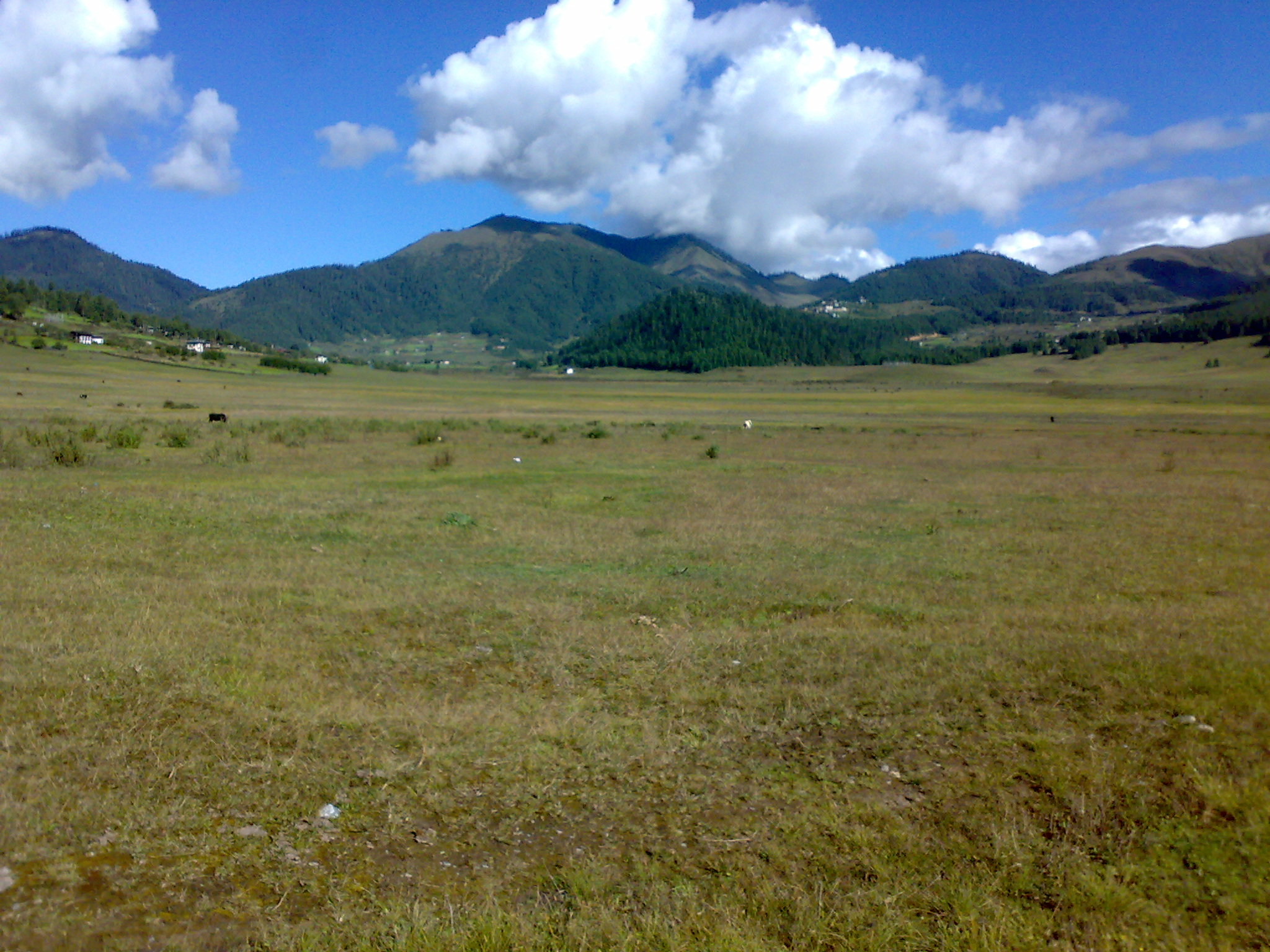
- The vast Phobjikha Valley
- Floor elevation: 3,000 m (9,800 ft)

Geography
- Population centers: Phobji Gewog, Gangteng Gewog
- Coordinates: 27°27′30″N 90°10′50″E
- Interactive map of Phobjikha Valley

Ramsar Wetland
- Official name: Gangtey-Phobji
- Designated: 2 May 2014
- Reference no.: 2264

The Phobjikha Valley ཕོབ་སྦྱིས་ཁ spelled as Pho-sbis-kha, (the suffix kha is an element in many place-names in Bhutan and its use is generally optional both in colloquial speech and in literary forms) is a vast U-shaped valley in central Bhutan. The valley houses one of the impressive ancient Buddhist monasteries in Bhutan known as Gangteng Monastery of the Nyingma sect in central Bhutan. The graceful black-necked cranes in Bhutan (Grus nigricollis) from the Tibetan Plateau visit the valley during the winter season to roost. On arrival in the Phobjikha Valley in the last week of October, the black-necked cranes circle the Gangteng Monastery three times and also repeat the process while returning to Tibet.

The broad valley, with its best-known marshland in Bhutan, is popular for its scenic splendour and cultural uniqueness. The valley is rich in faunal biodiversity and has, apart from the globally threatened black-necked cranes Grus nigricollis, 13 other globally threatened species. Within the ambit of the valley, an area of about 970 hectares (3.7 mi^{2}) has been declared a Ramsar site on May 2, 2014, a wetland of international importance which is managed by the Royal Society for the Protection of Nature (RSPN), for the protection of nature.

Tsechu, the colourful Mask Dance Festival of Bhutan and the Crane Festival welcoming the black-neck cranes in winter months are held every year in the precincts of the Phobjikha Valley, in the Gangtey Monastery courtyard. It also has a popular three-day trek route.

== Etymology ==
The Western regions of Bhutan has been exposed to the visitors and traders around 11 Century AD. This brought significant exposure to these areas which brought economic, social and religious gains. These benefits have enabled them to incorporate enormous Buddhist Dharma language into their dialect. The people were called as Ngalong meaning early riser and the language called as Ngalong Kha. On the contrary, the Phobjikha Valley have been referred to as Ngoen Lung which refers to the settlements that pre-existed the rise from the darkness. The valley has been known by the name Lhoma Ngönlung in the 13th century when the Bon religion was predominant in the valley. Longchen Rabjam, a buddhist lama who visited Bhutan also established the Ngenlung Drechagling in valley in the 14th century. Even during that time the valley was known as Ngenlung.

The origin of the valley's present name remains uncertain. One tradition attributes it to Lama Drukpa Kunley who, upon entering the valley, is said to have been struck by its broad, open expanse, and named it Phobjikha, meaning "expansive valley." Another account links the name to Gesar of Ling. According to this, Lingkarthang, a small plain in front of Gangtey Monastery, is regarded as Gesar's birthplace, and the surrounding valley as one of the sites of his battles. However, these explanations remain a part of local oral tradition rather than documented history.

== Geography ==
Location of Phobjikha Valley within Wangdue Phodrang District, Bhutan

The Phobjikha Valley is a vast valley at an elevation of about 3,000 metres (9,800 ft) on the west side by the Black Mountains (Bhutan) (range above 5,000 metres (16,000 ft) elevation) that separates western and central Bhutan. The valley covers most of Phobji and Gangteng Gewogs and some parts of Athang Gewog and contains the Gangteng Monastery, also known as Gangtey Gonpa, on a spur surrounded by the village Gangtey. The valley also hosts one of the eight Lings built by a great Buddhist saint Longchenpa which is called Ngenlung Drechagling. The valley is covered by a rich sward of grass in the marshy land where special variety of dwarf bamboo (Yushania microphylla) grows on which the black-necked cranes feed. The Nake Chuu and Phag Chuu River runs through this valley. Scenic views of the Phobjikha Valley are best below the spur of Gangteng Monastery and the other side of the valley in the east.

It is said that the pho bjikha valley is surrounded by nine great mountain passes, nine mountain peaks, and nine great local deities

Topography and drainage

The Phobjikha Valley is aligned northwest–southeast and composed of two major lateral valleys.

== Climate ==
The valley is enclosed by the mountain ranges, which experience snowfall. The valley also gets covered with snow during the winter months forcing people of the valley to shift to more pleasant climes during the months of January and February. The mean minimum temperature recorded in December is −4.8 °C (23.4 °F). The mean maximum temperature recorded in August is 19.9 °C (67.8 °F). The rainfall incidence varies from 1,472–2,189 millimetres (58.0–86.2 in).

Climate data for Phobjika, Wangdue Phodrang District, elevation 2,860 m (9,380 ft), (1996–2017 normals)
Month	Jan	Feb	Mar	Apr	May	Jun	Jul	Aug	Sep	Oct	Nov	Dec	Year
Mean daily maximum °C (°F)	9.4 (48.9)	10.8 (51.4)	13.1 (55.6)	15.8 (60.4)	17.6 (63.7)	19.6 (67.3)	20.0 (68.0)	20.3 (68.5)	18.9 (66.0)	16.7 (62.1)	13.2 (55.8)	10.6 (51.1)	15.5 (59.9)
Daily mean °C (°F)	3.0 (37.4)	3.8 (38.8)	6.8 (44.2)	9.3 (48.7)	12.3 (54.1)	14.8 (58.6)	15.7 (60.3)	15.9 (60.6)	14.6 (58.3)	11.2 (52.2)	6.5 (43.7)	3.3 (37.9)	9.8 (49.6)
Mean daily minimum °C (°F)	−3.5 (25.7)	−3.3 (26.1)	0.5 (32.9)	2.8 (37.0)	6.9 (44.4)	10.0 (50.0)	11.3 (52.3)	11.4 (52.5)	10.3 (50.5)	5.6 (42.1)	−0.3 (31.5)	−4.1 (24.6)	4.0 (39.1)
Average rainfall mm (inches)	3.7 (0.15)	11.0 (0.43)	90.0 (3.54)	188.7 (7.43)	273.9 (10.78)	267.7 (10.54)	516.3 (20.33)	530.4 (20.88)	211.3 (8.32)	97.4 (3.83)	36.6 (1.44)	1.2 (0.05)	2,228.2 (87.72)
Average relative humidity (%)	70.0	67.0	69.7	70.7	76.6	80.6	82.6	83.2	81.4	77.3	70.9	65.4	74.6
Source: National Center for Hydrology and Meteorology

== Economy ==
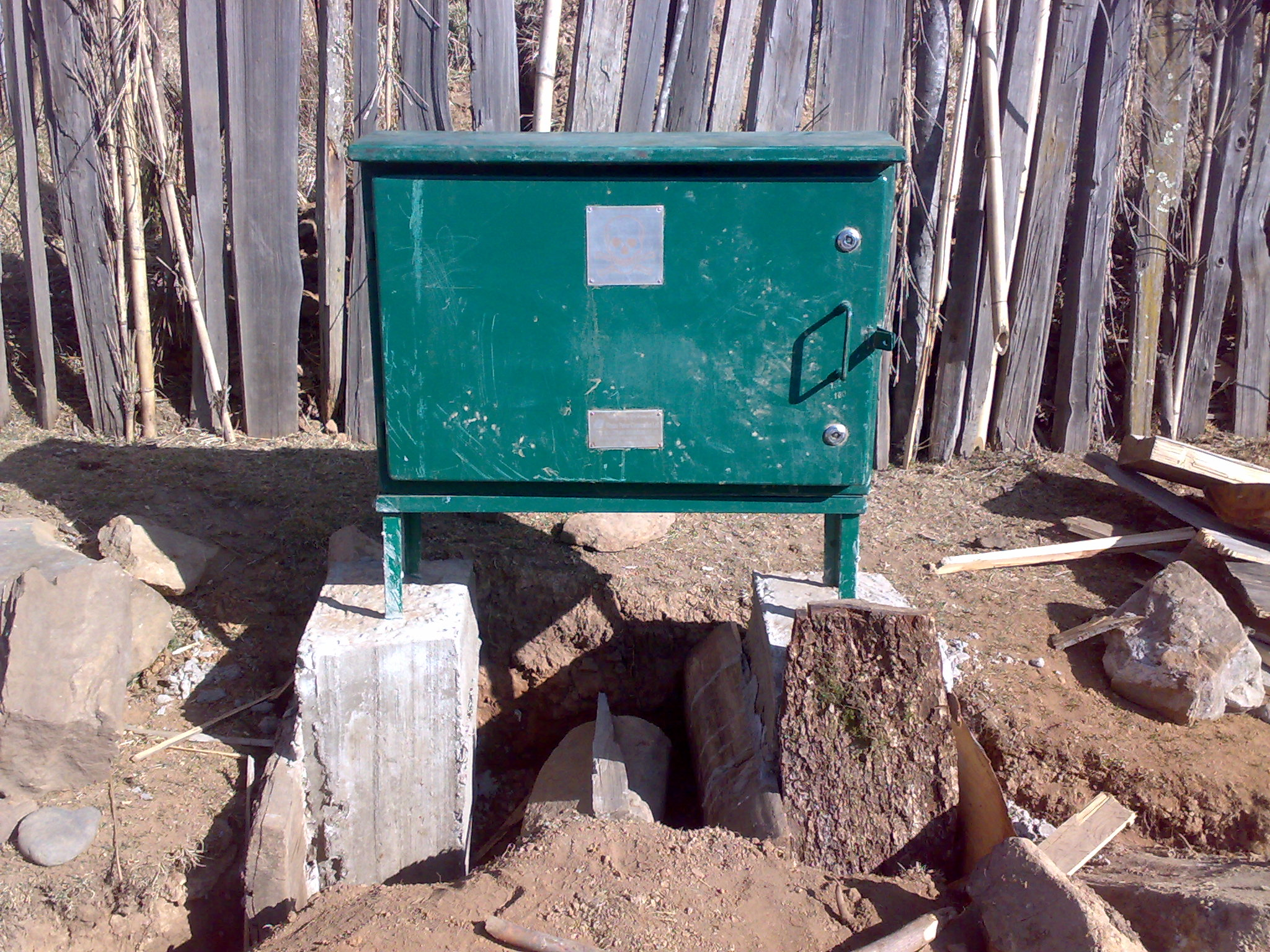
Electrification in Phobjikha Valley

The Phobjikha Valley, with its agrarian economy, is mostly underdeveloped with least modern facilities of water and sanitation. Transport and communication facilities are also not adequate. But with the development of the country, the two mobile service providers of the country established the cellular networks. This connected the valley to the rest of the world. B-Mobile installed its first cellular network in the year 2008 during the consecration ceremony of the newly built Gangteng Monastery. In view of protection provided to the cranes which visit the valley in winter, as a conservation measure overhead transmission lines for electric supply have not been permitted to be provided. Solar heaters, solar powered cells and diesel generators are used to provide electricity in the past but now the valley is connected to the national grid using underground electrical cable system.

== Demographics ==
The Phobjikha Valley is located in the Wangdue Phodrang District (Phobji and Gangteng Gewogs) in central Bhutan. The valley has about 4,500 people (4,716 has been reported) residing in Gangten and other villages, and in the Gangten Monastery that is strategically located on a spur above the valley. During the winter season, as the valley gets covered by snow, some population of the valley including the monks shifts to a more conducive climate (during months of January and February) in the Wangdue Phodrang area, which is about 60 kilometres (37 mi) away by road.

=== Ethnicity ===
Two major ethnic groups reside within the valley. The major ethnic group of the people living in the valley has a special identity and their language is a dialect known as Nyenkha or Henkha (inferred to be archaic Tibetan), a language under the Bumthang group of languages. It is a dialect restricted to certain pockets of the Trongsa and Wangdue Phodrang Districts. Bye Kya or Henkha means the early language and the speakers of dialect are confined to the northern, eastern and western areas surrounding the Black Mountains range.

The latter ethnic group is those of Ngalong origin speaking the Ngalongkha which is the same as Dzongkha.

The Black Mountain Region is also inhabited by nomadic shepherds and yak-herders. The ancient animistic religion of Bhutan namely, the Bon religion, is still practiced by some of the villagers.

== Flora and fauna ==
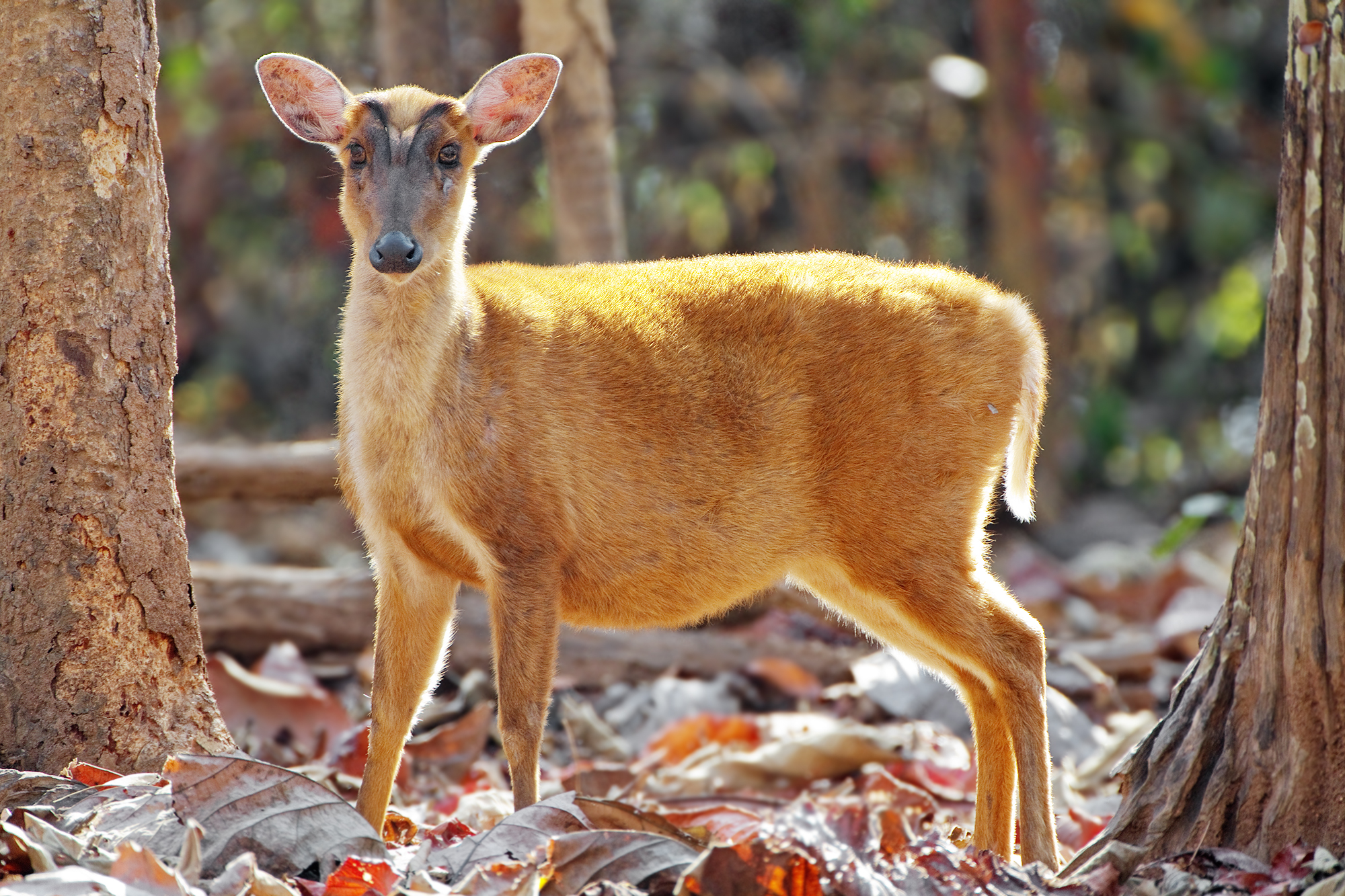
Barking deer

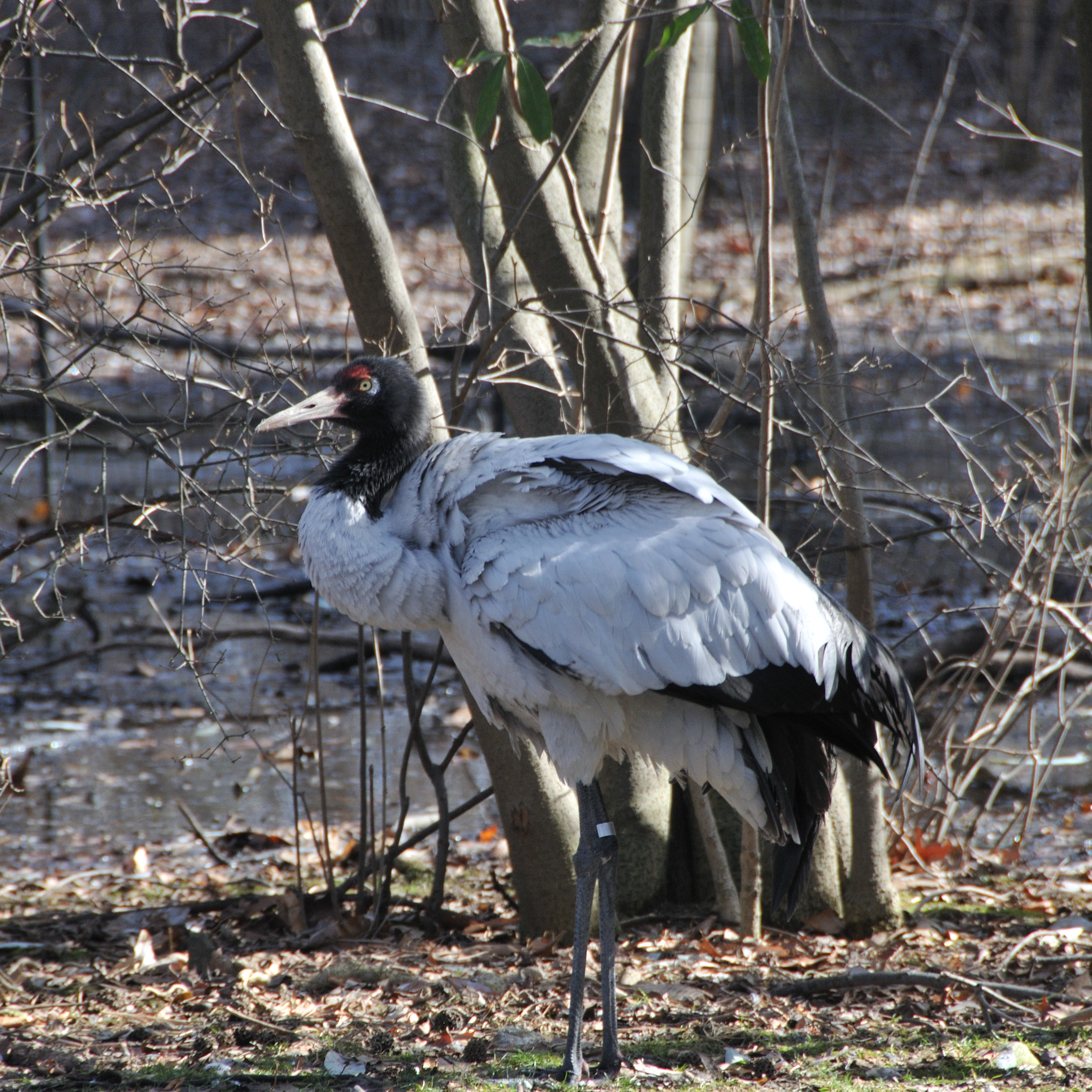
Black-necked crane

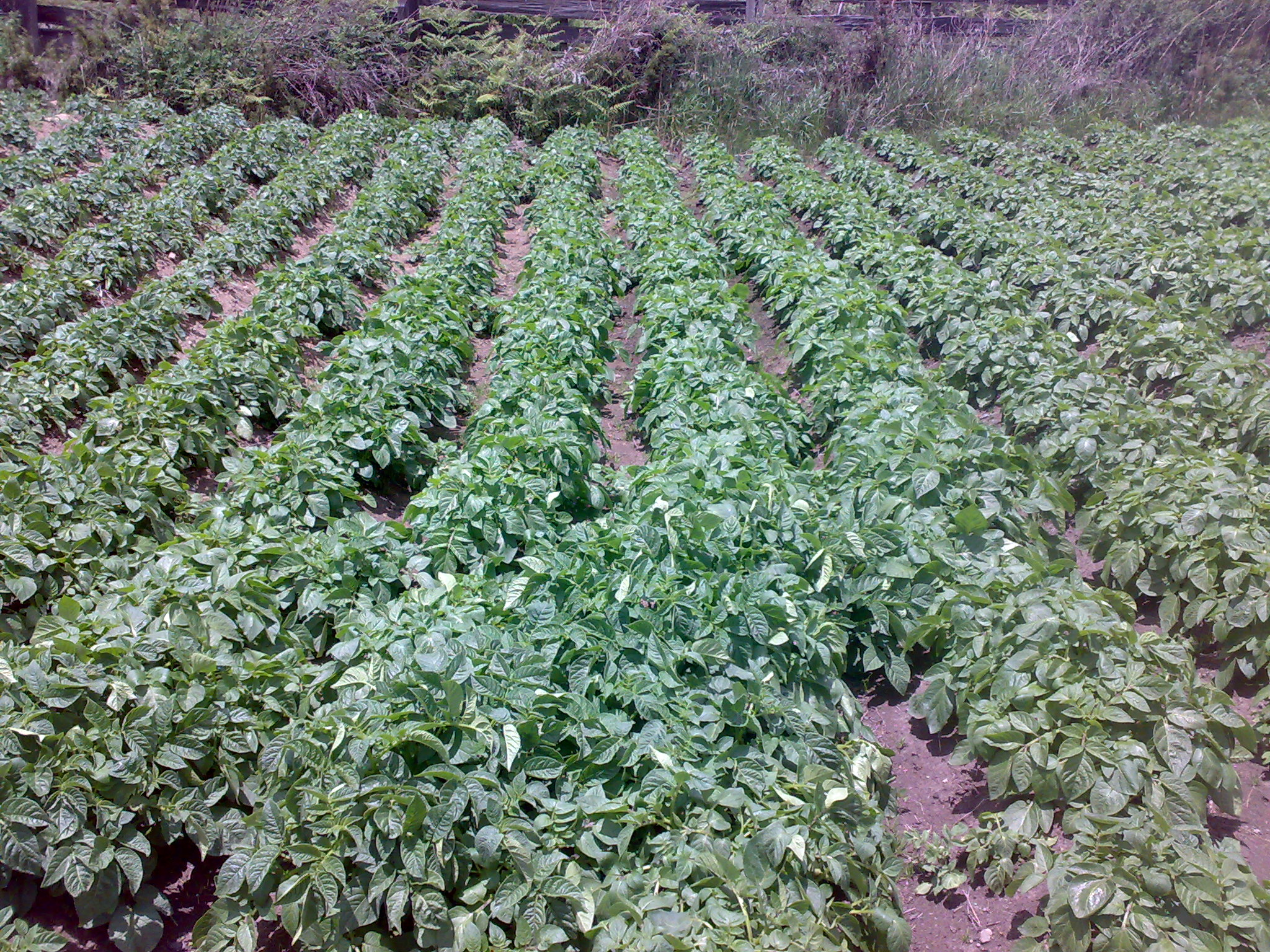
Potato plantation in Phobjikha

The picturesque Phobjika Valley, in the backdrop of the Black Mountain Range, has a rich biodiversity of flora and fauna. This, coupled with the religious importance of the Gangten Monastery, has attracted religious and ecotourism to the valley.

Vegetation

The Phobjika valley is marshy land and has a sward of grassy pastures where cattle and horses graze. A special kind of dwarf bamboo grows here, which attracts the black-necked cranes to roost and feed in the valley during the winter season. Potatoes are the main cash crop grown in the valley. Turnips are also grown. Other tree species seen are coniferous vegetation of blue pine, birch, maple and several species of rhododendrons.

Crops

The valley is known for its seed potato crop as the soil and atmospheric conditions in the valley are free from insects and diseases that normally affect this crop. The crop is mainly exported to India where there is great demand for this variety. This has generated interest in the valley to convert the wetlands or marshy lands of the valley into farms by draining the area of its water logging to produce cash crops. However, interest to preserve the habitat of the black-necked crane in the valley, the religious significance that is attached to the black-necked cranes, and the tourism that has developed around the famous Gangten Monastery and the cranes, the institutions like the Royal Society for the Protection of Nature (RSPN) have prevailed upon the Government of Bhutan to stop any conversion of the valley land into farms. Palje "Benjie" Dorji, former Chief Justice of Bhutan, former Minister for Environment, and uncle of the present King of Bhutan, as the Chairman of the Royal Bhutan Society and as the founder of the Black-necked Conservation Programme helped to drop the proposal to drain the wetlands of the Phobjika Valley to create farms to grow cash rich seed potatoes. However, it has been suggested that as cranes are valued more, the people who cannot grow cash-rich potatoes here need to be compensated. It has also been suggested that the effect of tourism on cranes in the Phobjika Valley should also be studied.

Fauna

The valley and hills surrounding it are rich in wildlife. The fauna recorded are the muntjacs (barking deer), wild boars, sambar, Himalayan black bear, Himalayan serow, leopards and foxes.

Avifauna

The Phobjika Valley has several vulnerable species of birds in the Protected Conservation Area established in 2003. The most celebrated species of the region is the black-necked crane. The other vulnerable species are the chestnut-breasted partridge (Arborophila mandellii), wood snipe (Gallinago nemoricola), Blyth's tragopan (Tragopan blythii), greater spotted eagle (Aquila clanga), imperial eagle (Aquila heliaca), Baer's pochard (Aythya baeri), Hodgson's bushchat (Saxicola insignis), dark-rumped swift (Apus acuticauda), and grey-crowned prinia (Prinia cinereocapilla).The Conservation Area of 163 square kilometres (63 mi^{2}), which includes Gewogs of Phobji, Gangte and Bjena under the Wangdue Phodrang dzongkhag, has been leased out for Conservation Planning and Management to the Royal Society for the Protection of Nature (RSPN), a non-governmental organization (NGO) set up in Bhutan in 1987 (legally incorporated in 1997). RSPN is involved not only in the conservation management of the black-necked cranes and their habitat but also in conducting research on public education and awareness, community empowerment for conservation, and integrated conservation and development programmes, including community-based ecotourism in the valley. The black-necked cranes arrive in this valley in late October and depart in mid-February.

== Festivals ==
=== Black-necked crane festival ===
In the Phobjikha valley, in particular, the black-necked cranes have a celebrity status, as witnessed by the Crane Festival held every year on 12 November, soon after their arrival from the Tibetan Plateau in late October. The festival is celebrated in the courtyards of the Gangten Gonpa and in the entire Phobjikha Valley. The festival is attended by a large number of local people. On this occasion, children wearing crane costumes perform choreographed crane dances. During this period, cranes are seen flying at high altitudes over the mountains. Many tourists also visit the valley to witness this festival.

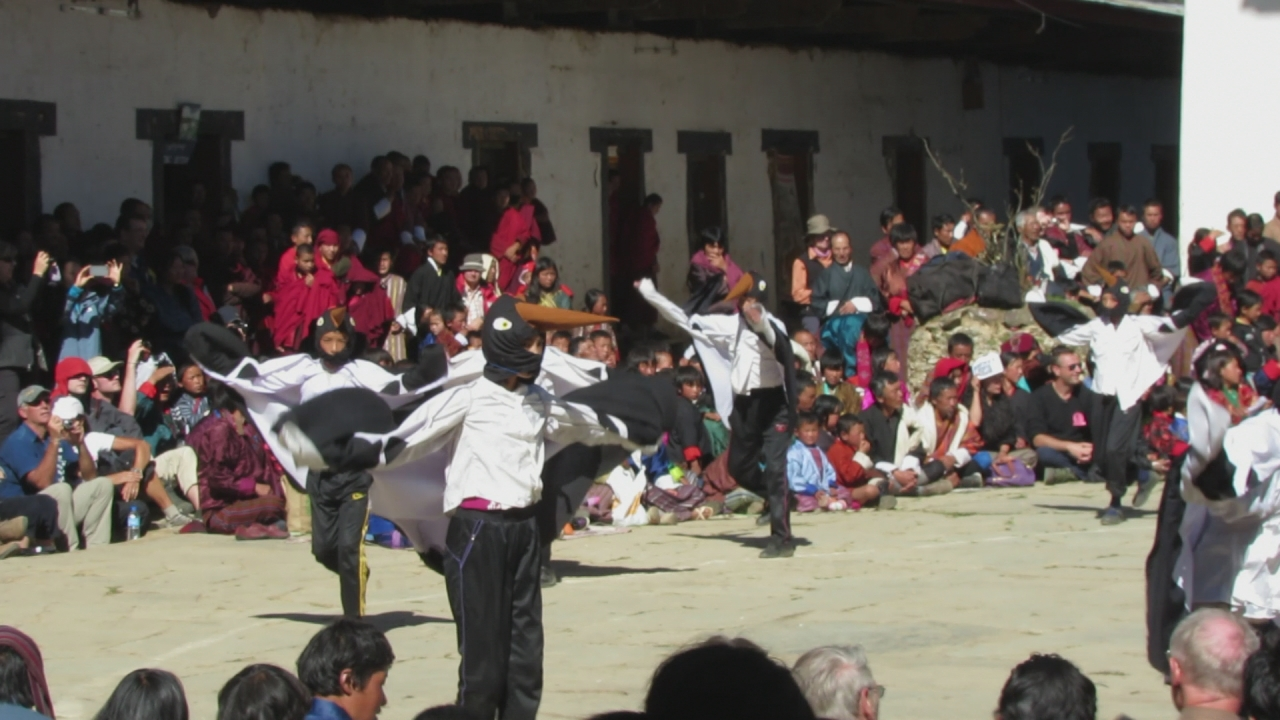
School students dancing the Black-necked Crane dance at the courtyard of Gangteng Monastery

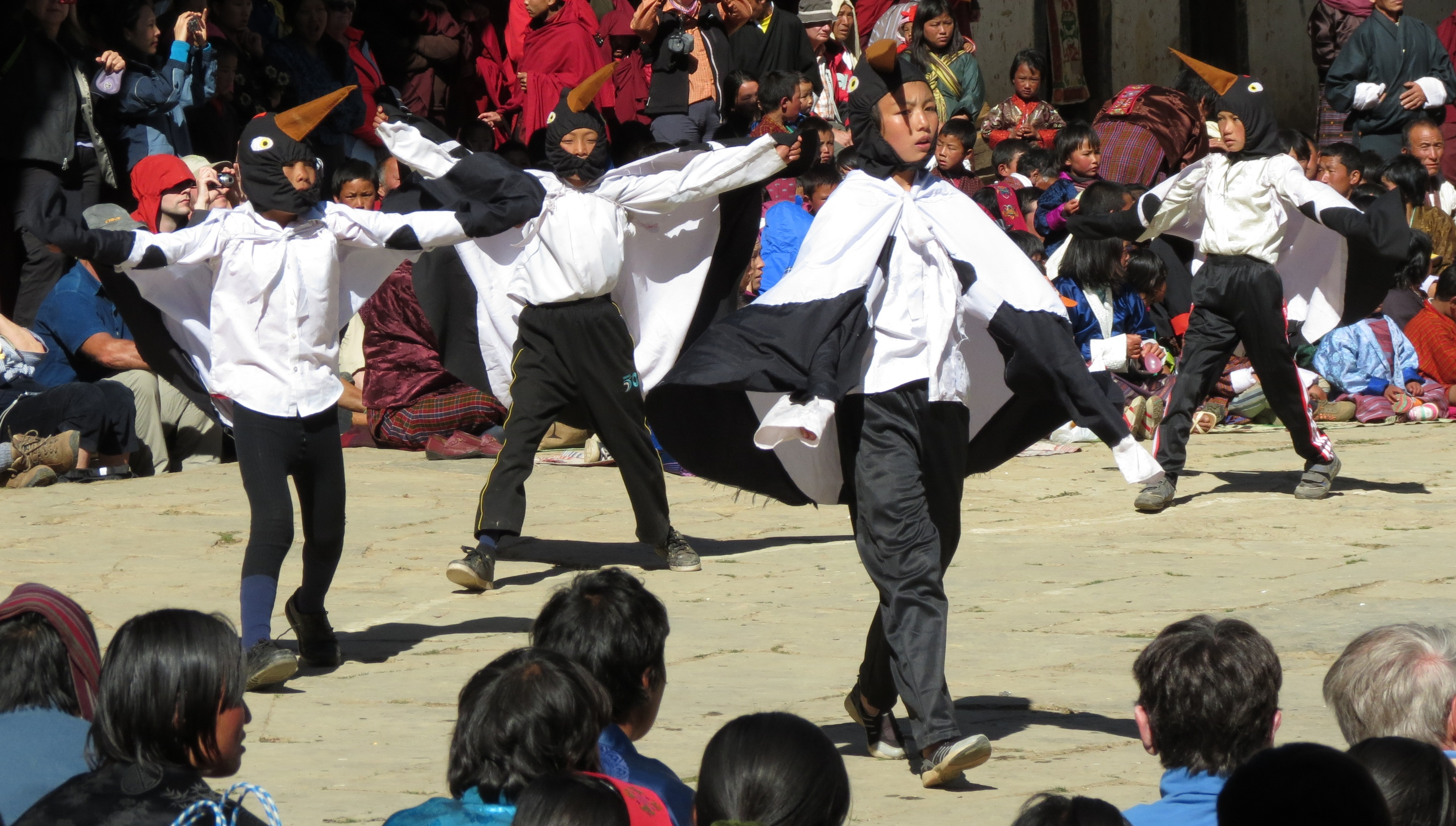
Children dancing the Black-necked Crane dance

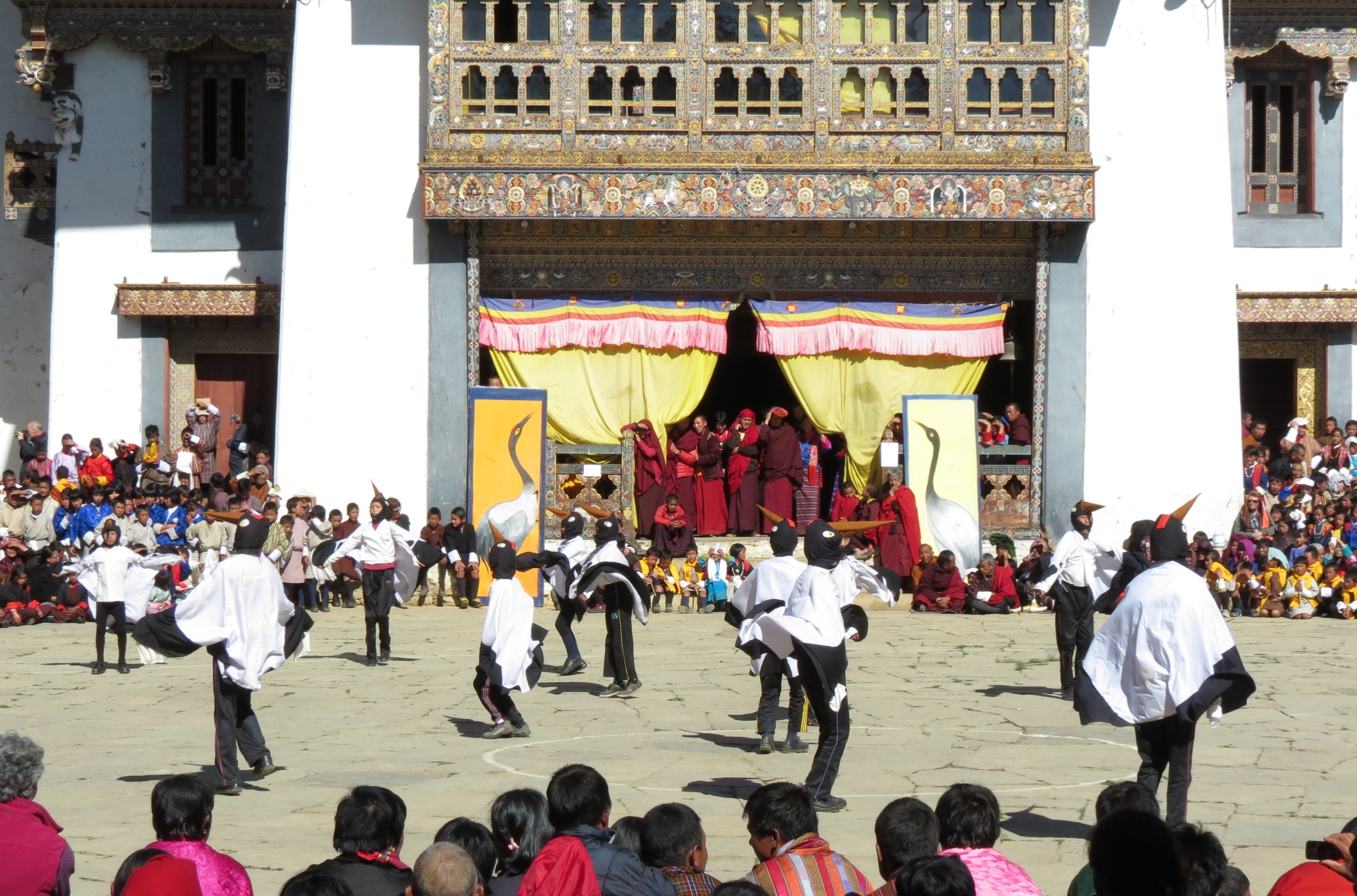
Black-necked crane dance

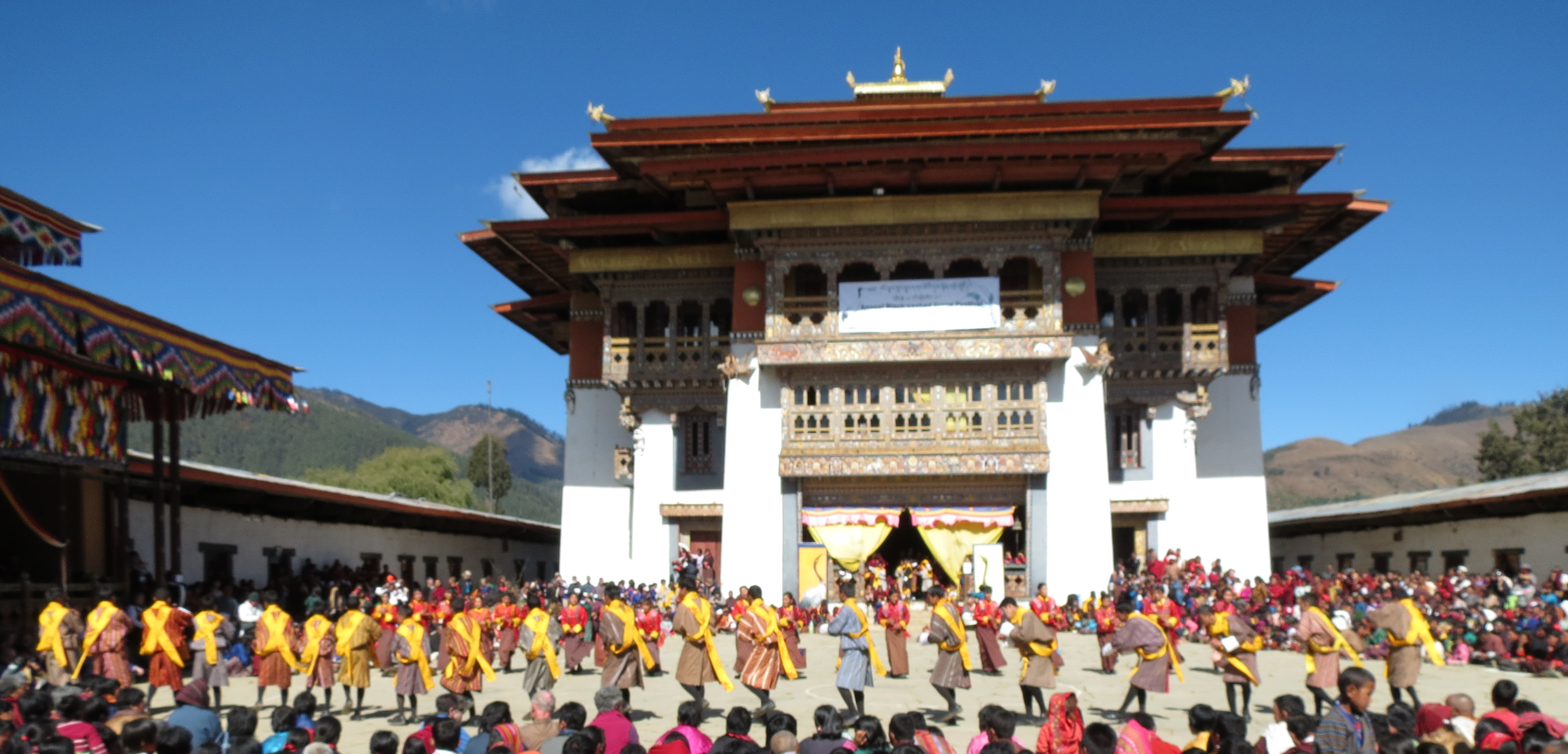
Students dancing to a traditional song

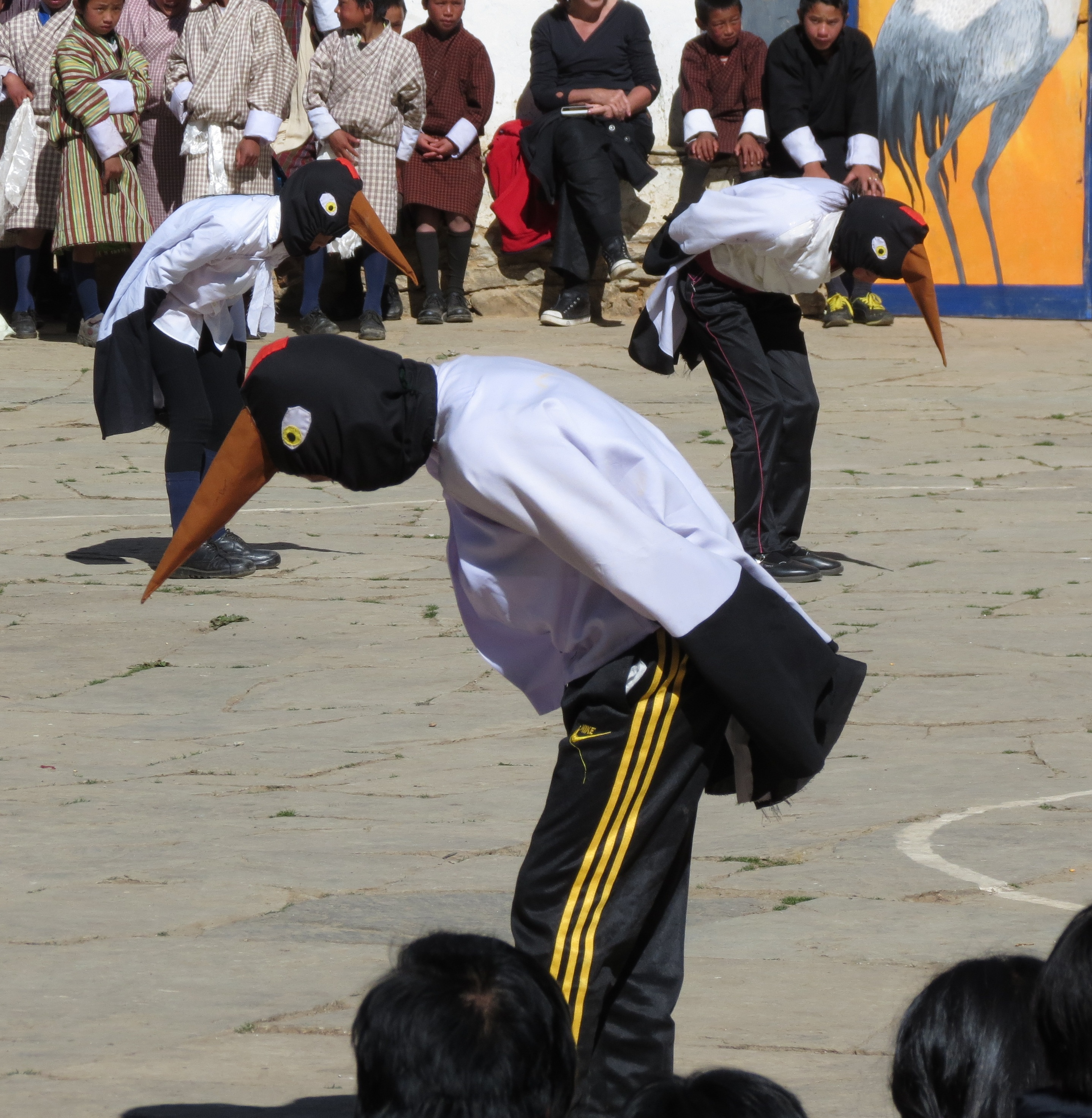
Children dressed in costume resembling the Black-necked crane dance the famous Black-necked crane dance

=== Gangtey Tshechu ===
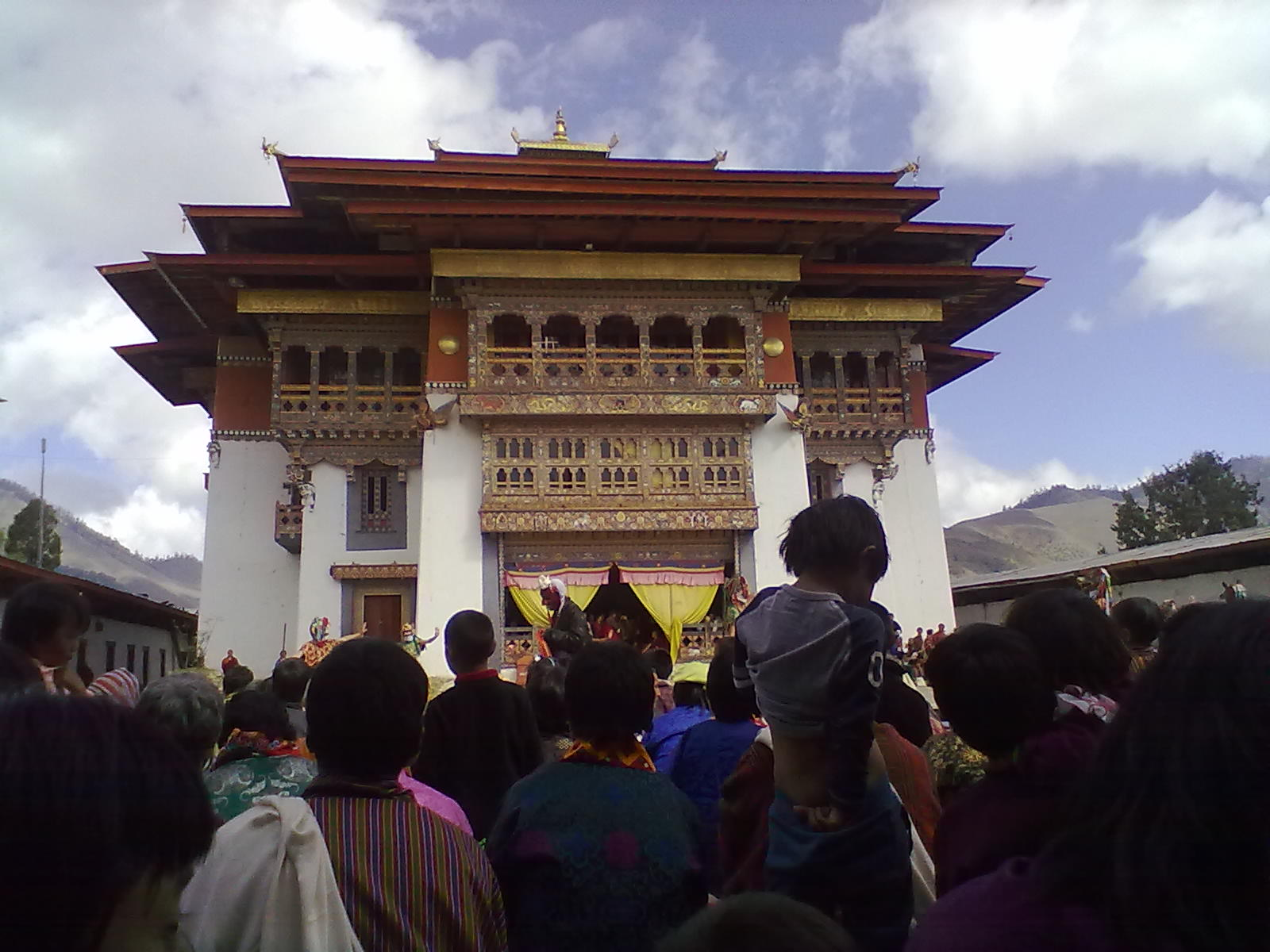
Villagers witnessing the annual Gangten Tshechu

Another special festival observed by the people of the valley is the annual Tsechu, which is held in the Gangteng Monastery from the 5th to 10th days of the eighth lunar month, as per the Bhutanese calendar. Mask dances are a special feature of the festival. The festival attracts many foreign tourists.

== Buddhist temples ==
=== Kumbu Lhakhang ===
The epithet Kumbu could have been derived from Kumbu Bja which is the name of a cliff above the village. The name "Kumbu" have been a derivative name from "Kubum" meaning a hundred thousand statues. The local people have a strong belief that the cliff actually contains a thousand statues. The Kumbu Lhakhang is located on the northern side of the Gangteng Gonpa. The temple was originally built as a bonpo temple by Zhabdrung Tshanden Dulwa in the thirteenth century. He was a bonpo lama. Another temple was founded by him at Sewagang in Nyisho in Wangdue Phodrang. The temple is believed to be the residing place of the Ma Sripa Gyalmo, the Bonpo religious protectress.

=== Ngenlung Drechagling ===
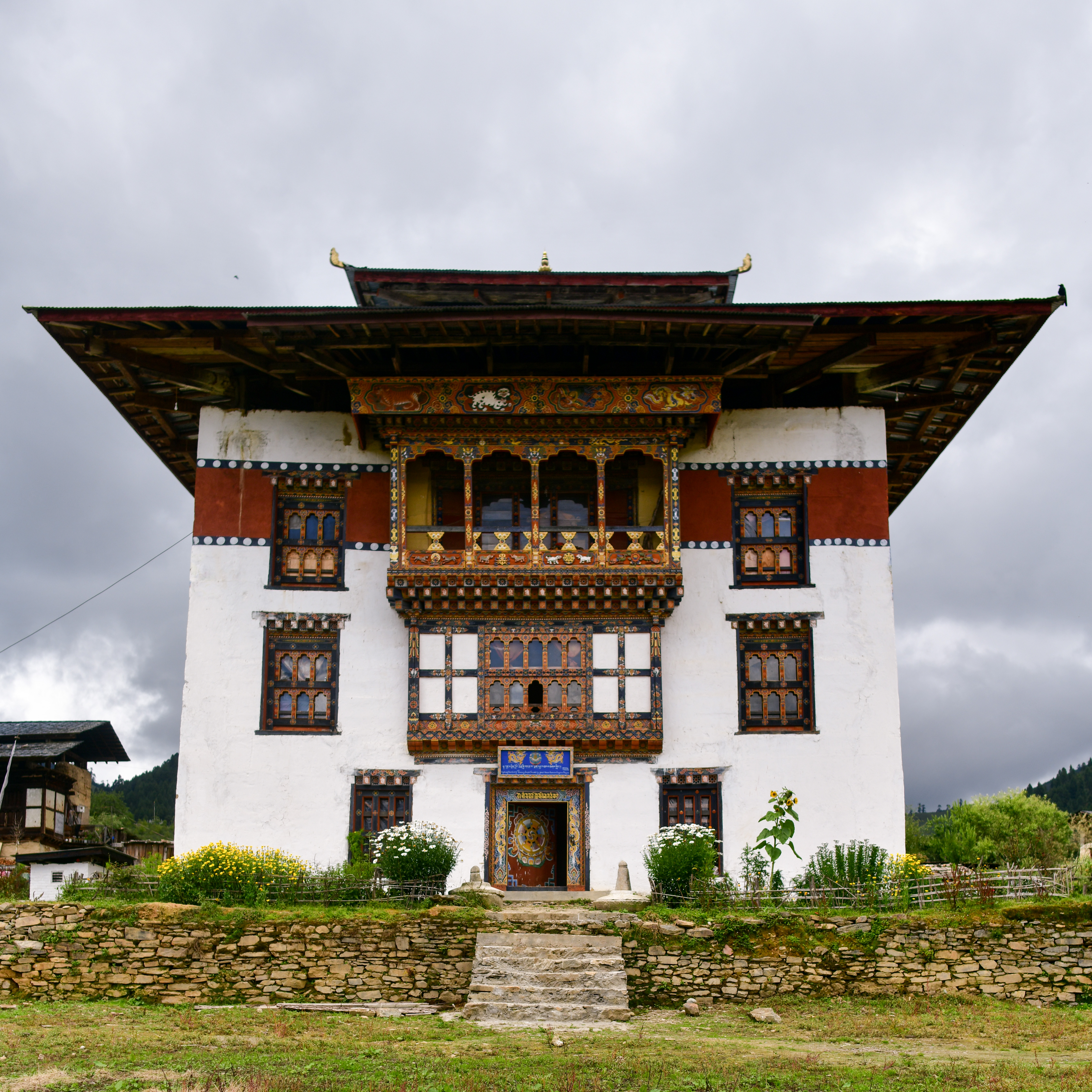
Gela Lhakhang

Ngenlung Drechagling Lhakhang is one of the eight temples built by Kuenkhen Longchen Rabjam who is popularly known as Longchenpa.

=== Damche Lhakhang ===
Damche Lhakhang or Damchoe Lhakhang was founded and constructed by Trulku Paljor Gyeltshen who was the son of Longchen Rabjam in the 14th century.

=== Khewang Lhakhang ===
This temple is located to the north of Tabiting and southwest of Gophu village. It is located on the valley floor. Built in the 15th century, the temple features three stories with each story featuring present, past, and future Buddhas. The temple was built by Trulku Paljor Gyeltshen.

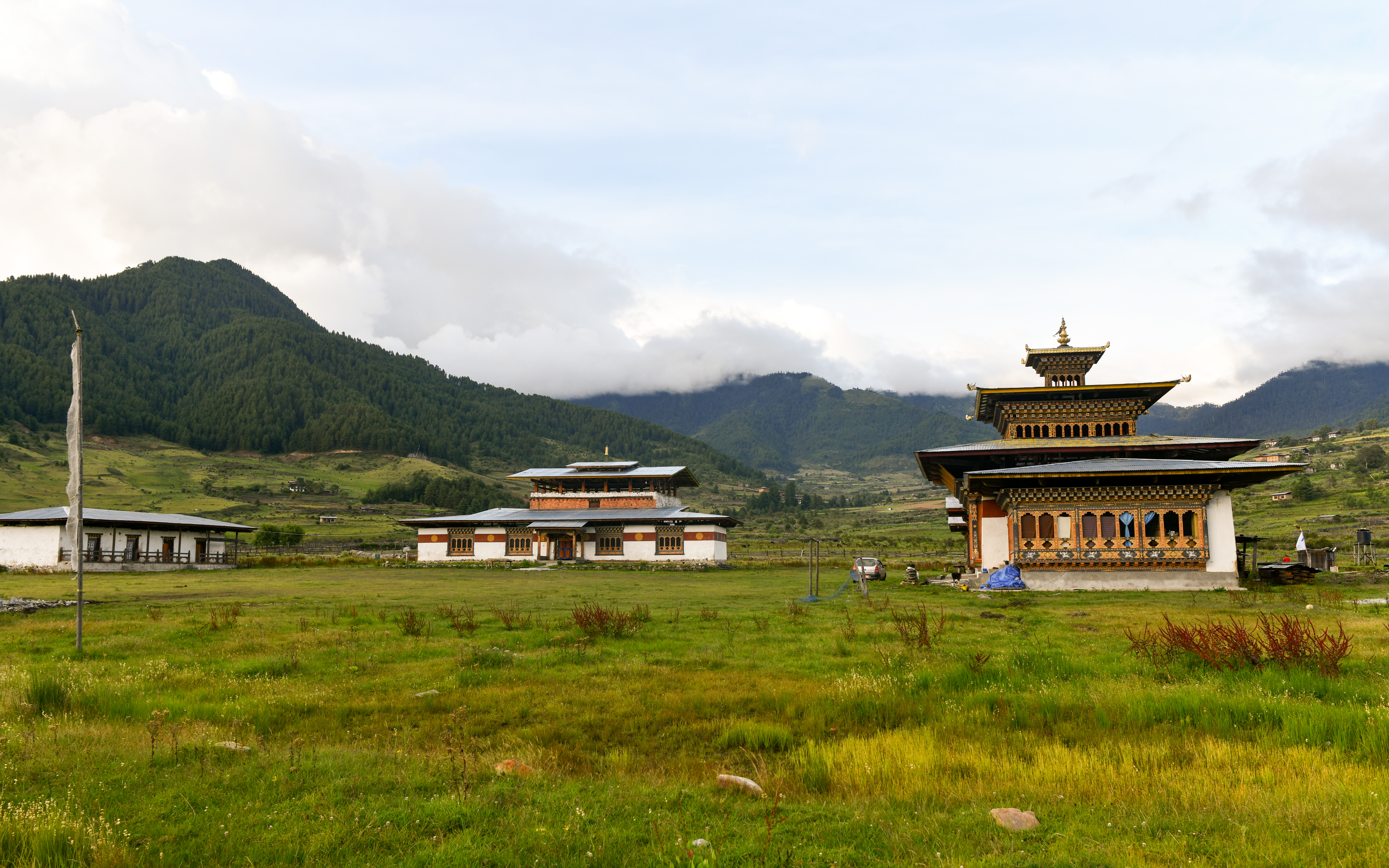
Khewang Lhakhang

== Institutions ==
=== Education ===
==== Phobjikha Central School ====
The school was initially established as the first non-monastic school within the Phobjikha valley and was located near the Gangtey Gonpa. Later it was moved to the wide plain area which now falls within the Phobjikha Ramsar site until 2010. Since the school location fell within the Ramsar site, it was relocated to the present location with financial assistance of JICA. Since 2016, the school became a central school.

==== Bayta Primary School ====
Bayta Primary school is located below Gangtey Gonpa and was constructed in 2005.

==== Rameychen Primary School ====
The school name has its origin to the location of the school where it was used as a grazing land for the cattle. "Raam" referring to the grazing place of cattle. Located at around 8 kilometers from the Tabiding area, it was established as a community primary school in 2002 with only five teachers.

=== Monastic Schools ===
==== Do-ngag Tösam Rabgayling ====
This institution is a Nyingma monastic college or shedra.

==== Shechen Nunnery ====
This institute is located between Kilkhorthang and Nimphey villages.

=== Health Care Centres ===
The health care centre in the valley mainly consists of a hospital and a few outreach clinics. Phobjikha hospital is located at Yuesa near the Phobjikha Central School.

=== Nature/environmental Conservation ===
==== Royal Society for Protection of Nature ====
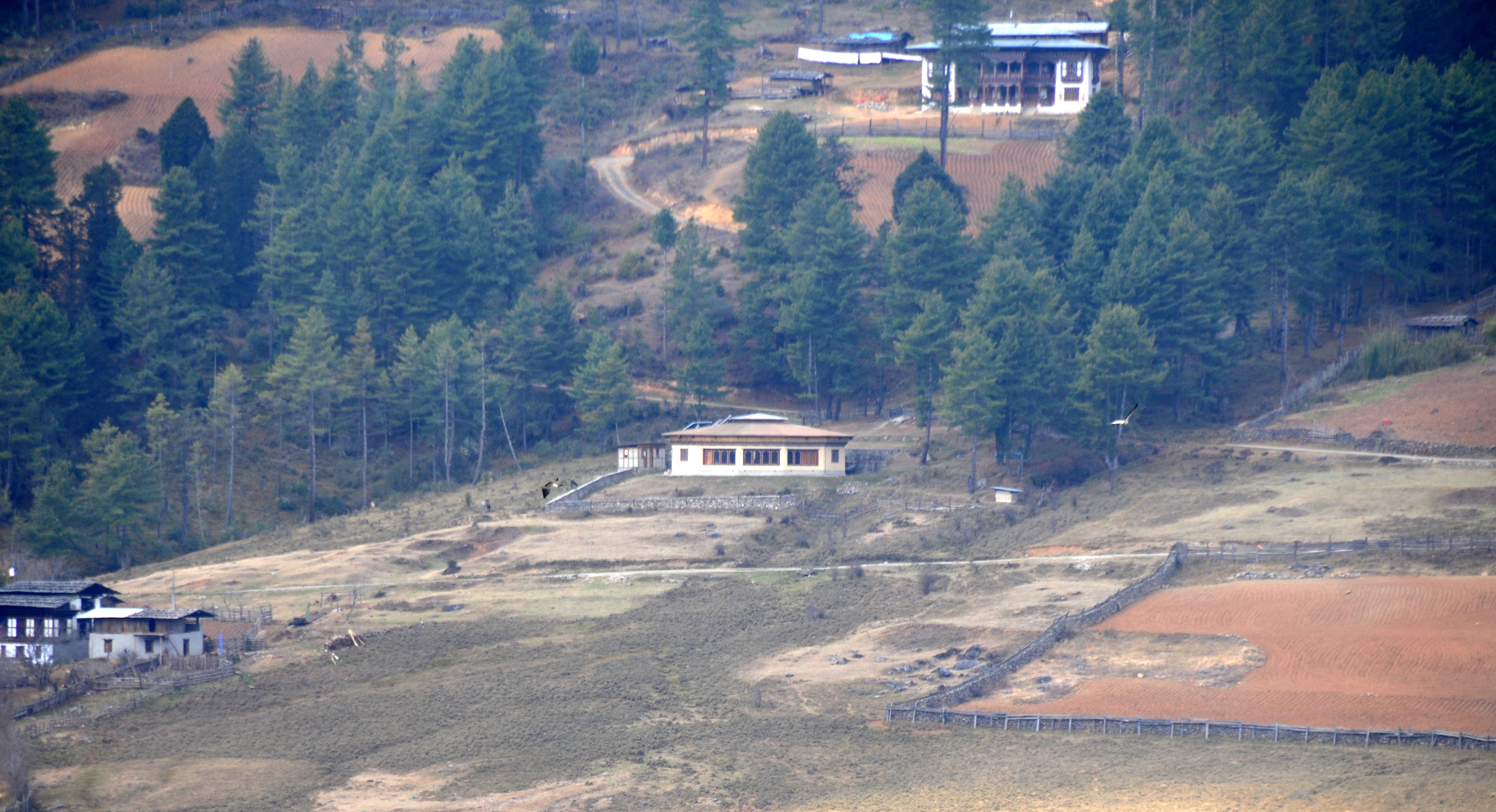
The Black-necked Crane information centre

== Trekking/hiking trails ==
Phobjikha Valley trek is popular trekking that takes three days to complete and is part of the religious tourism and ecotourism that is promoted by the Government of Bhutan and other concerned NGO organizations.

Gangtey treks are also popular tourist attractions in the Phobjikha Valley, which covers the Gangteng Gonpa. These trekking routes followed by international trekking enthusiasts start from the Gangteng Gonpa in the Phobjikha Valley. The treks pass through the Kumbu village (east of the Gonpa), goes through the Gedachen and Khebayathang villages, lead to the Kilhorthang village, and terminate in the Kilkhortang Lhakhang. A short trek of about 90 minutes known as the 'Gangte Nature Trail' starts from the Mani stone wall to the north of the Gangteng Gonpa and ends in Khewa Lhakhang.

== Gallery ==
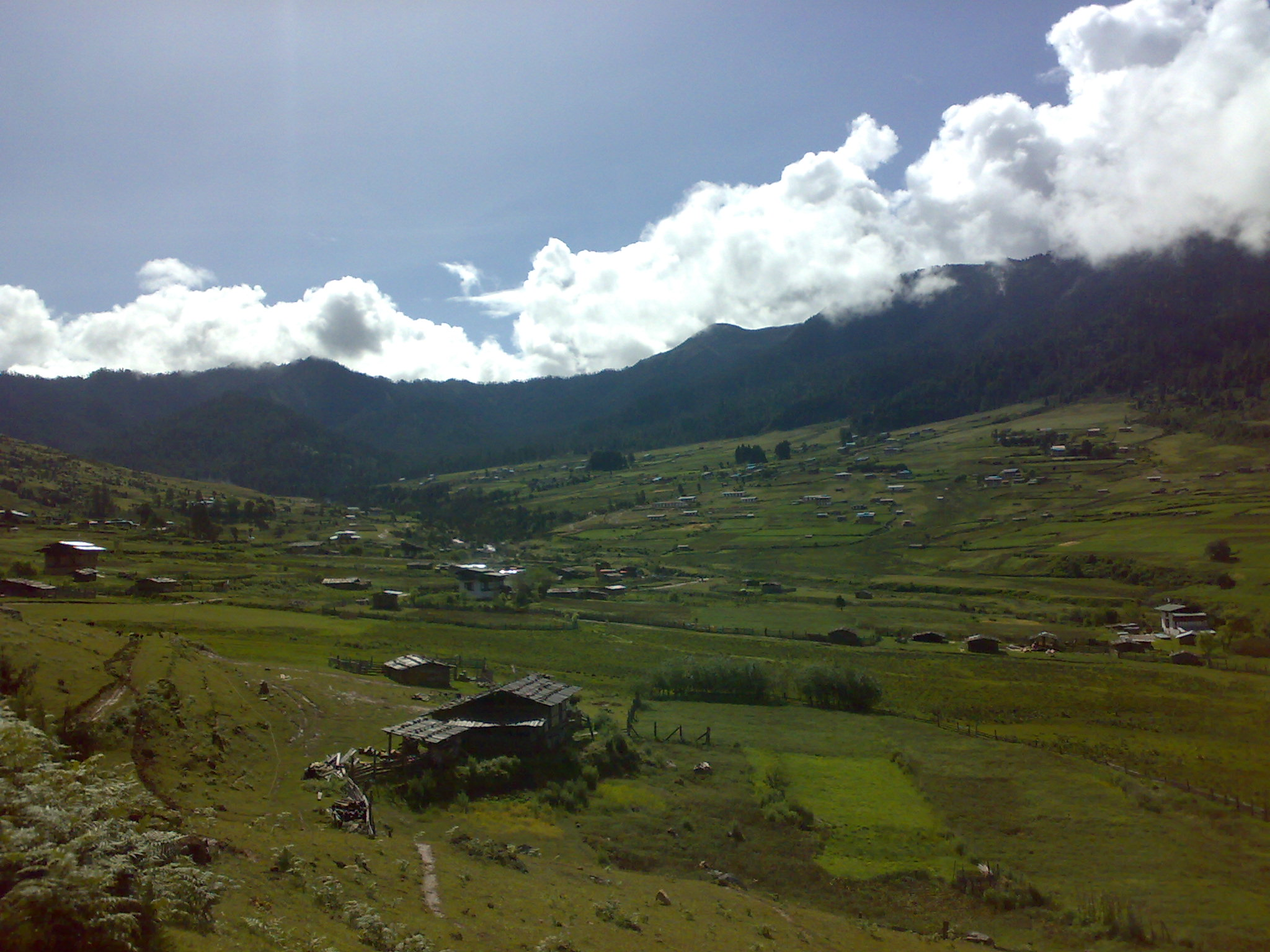
Summer in Phobjikha

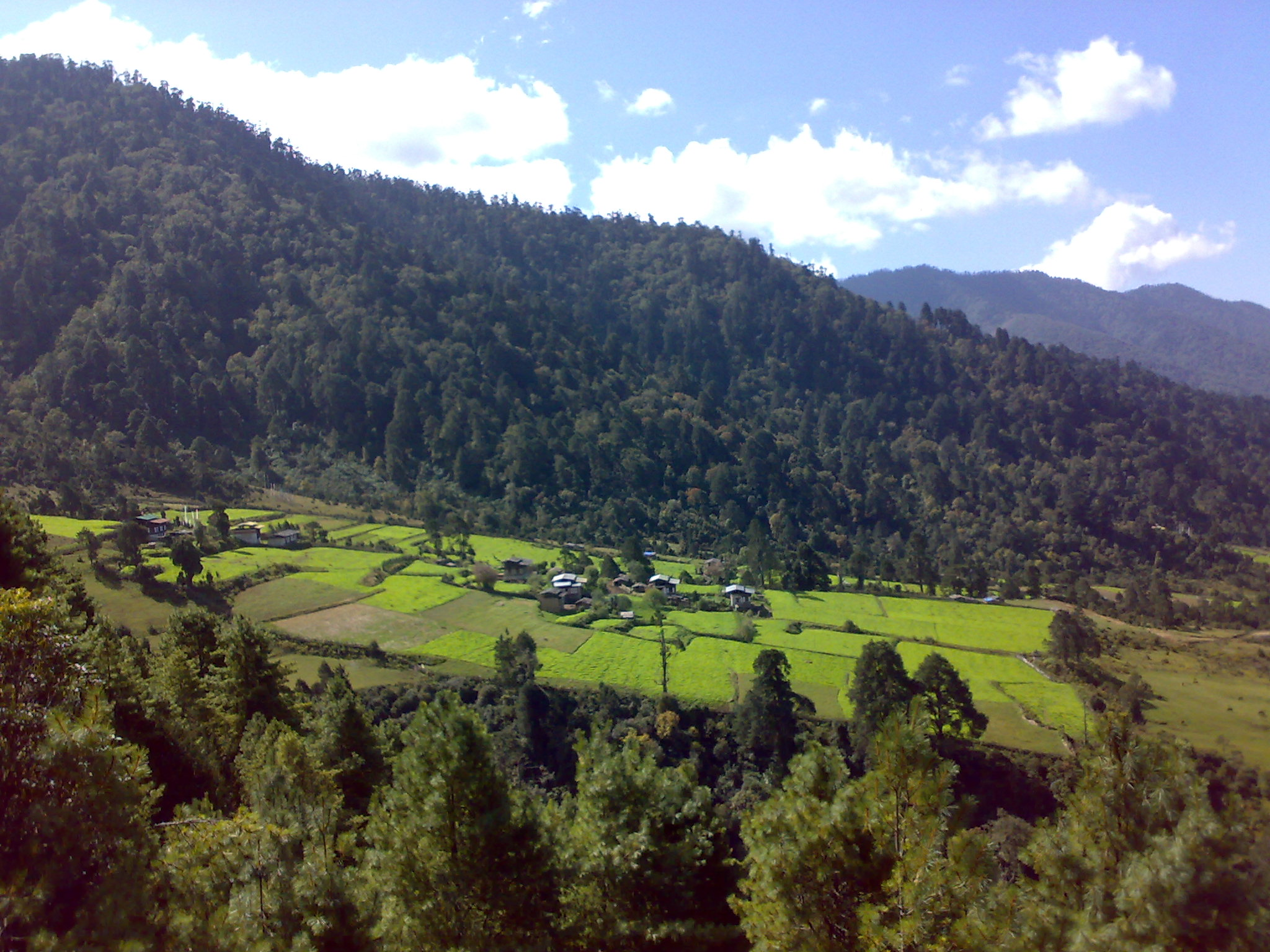
Pisting village

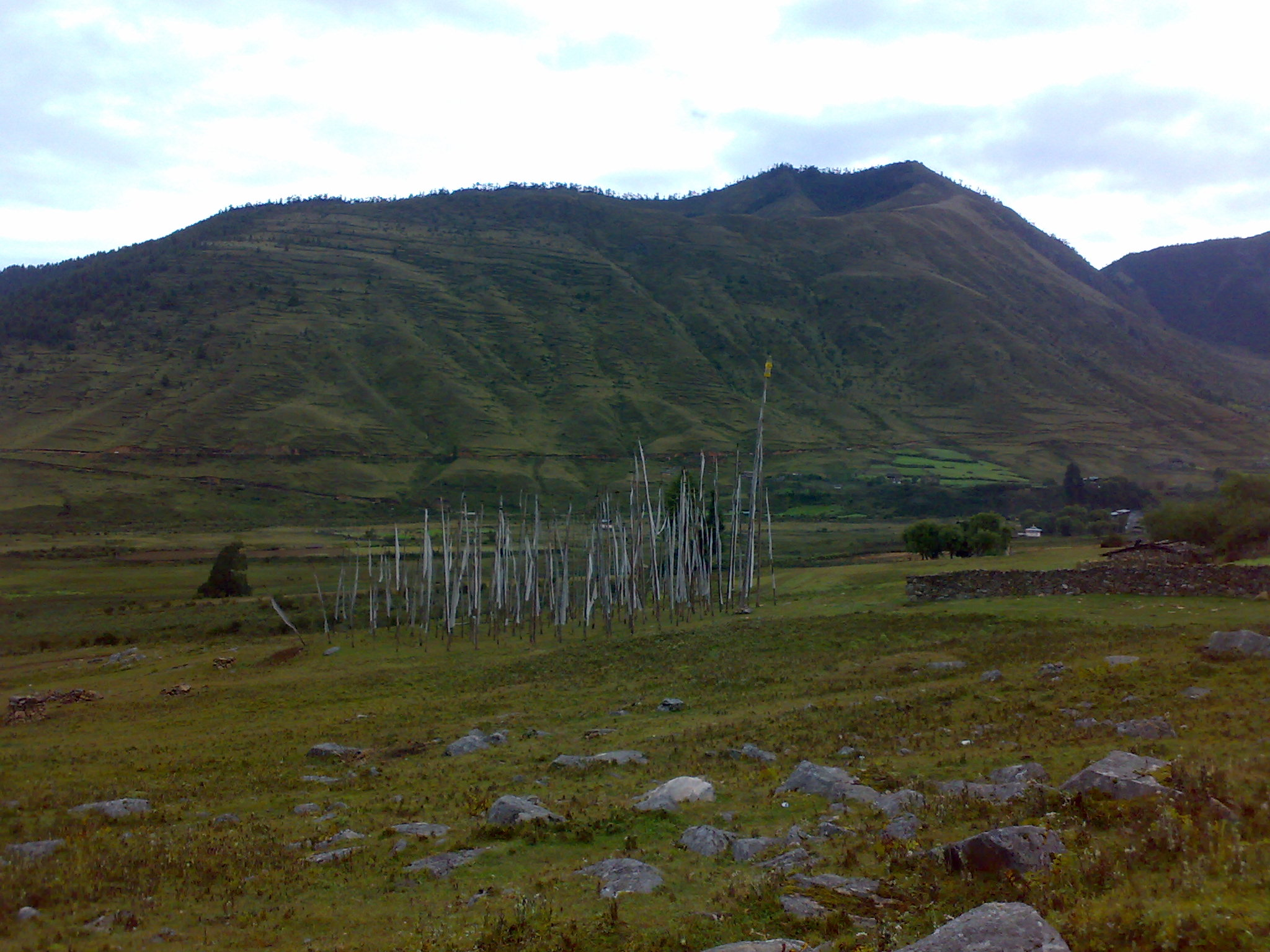
The valley as seen from Kephay

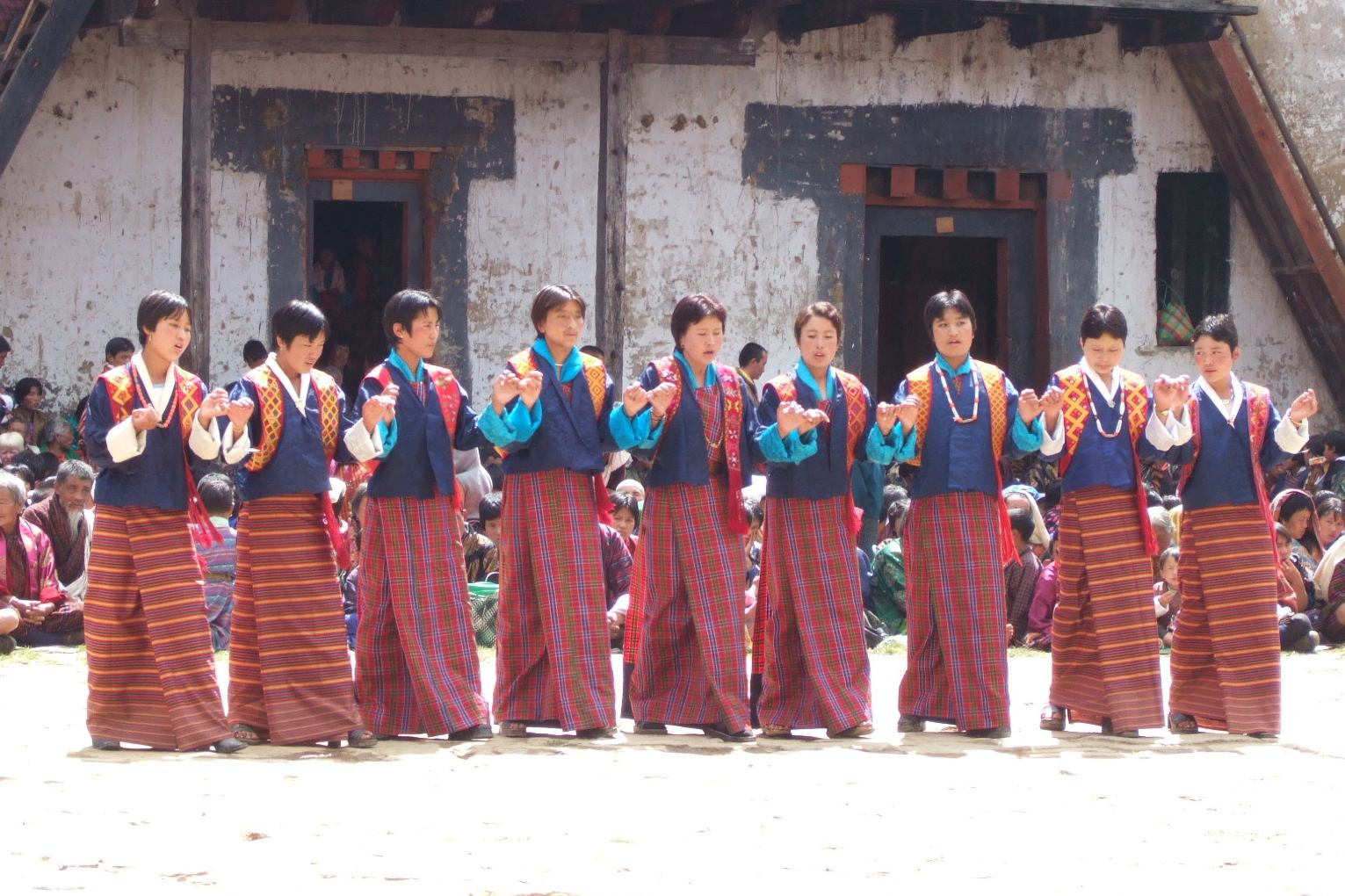
Girls in national dress dancing during the annual Gangteng tshechu in Phobjikha Valley

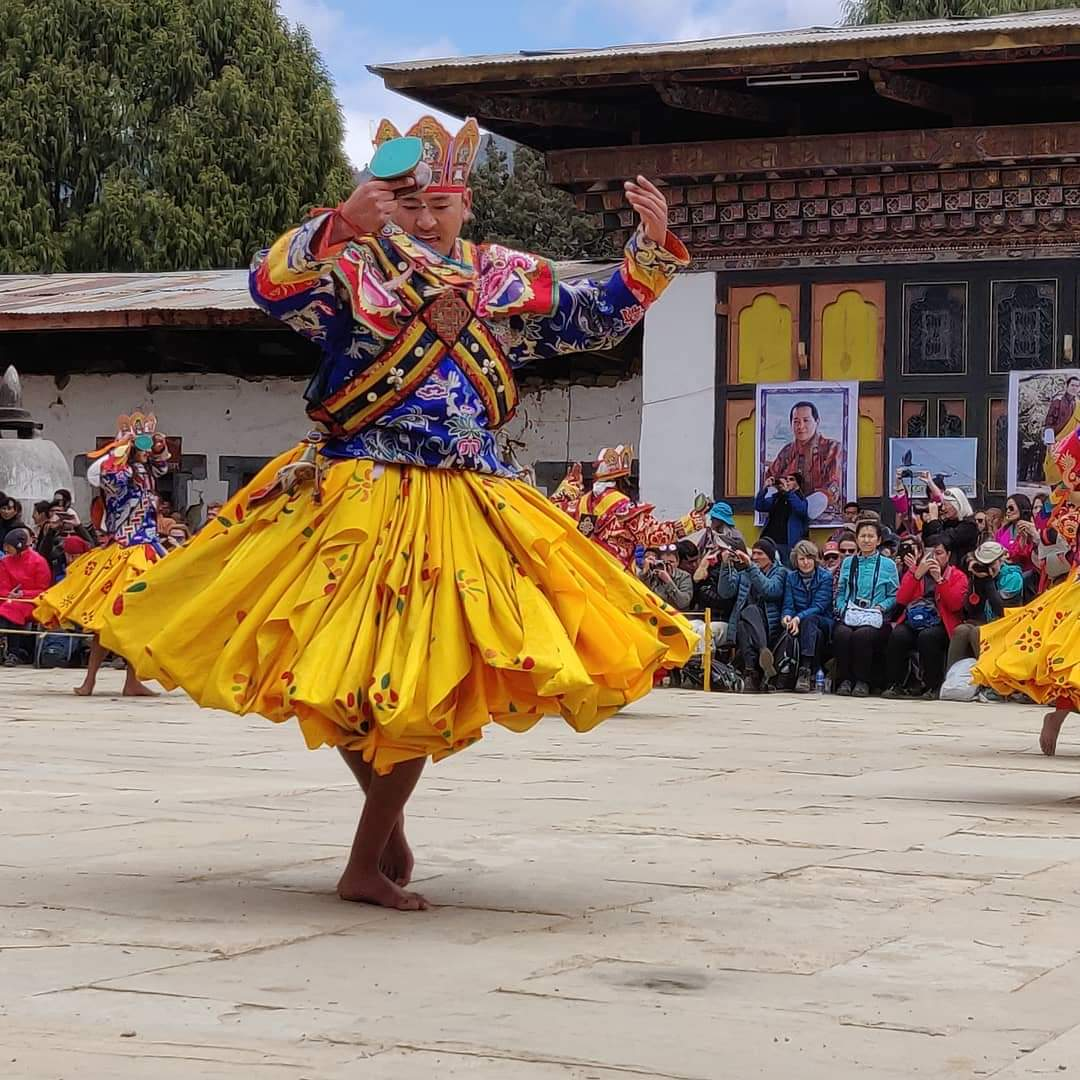
Traditional Buddhist Mask Dance at the Black-necked Crane Festival, Gangte Monastery, Phobjikha Valley, Bhutan

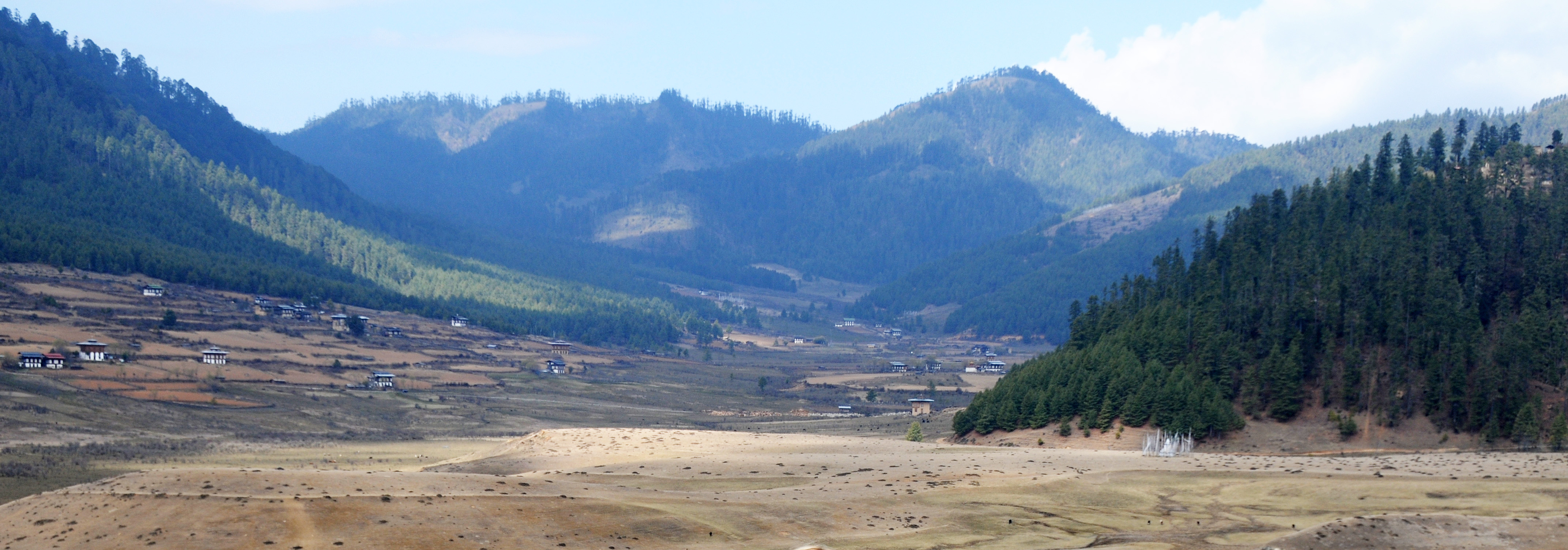
Phobjikha Valley - walk in the crane reserve - Bhutan

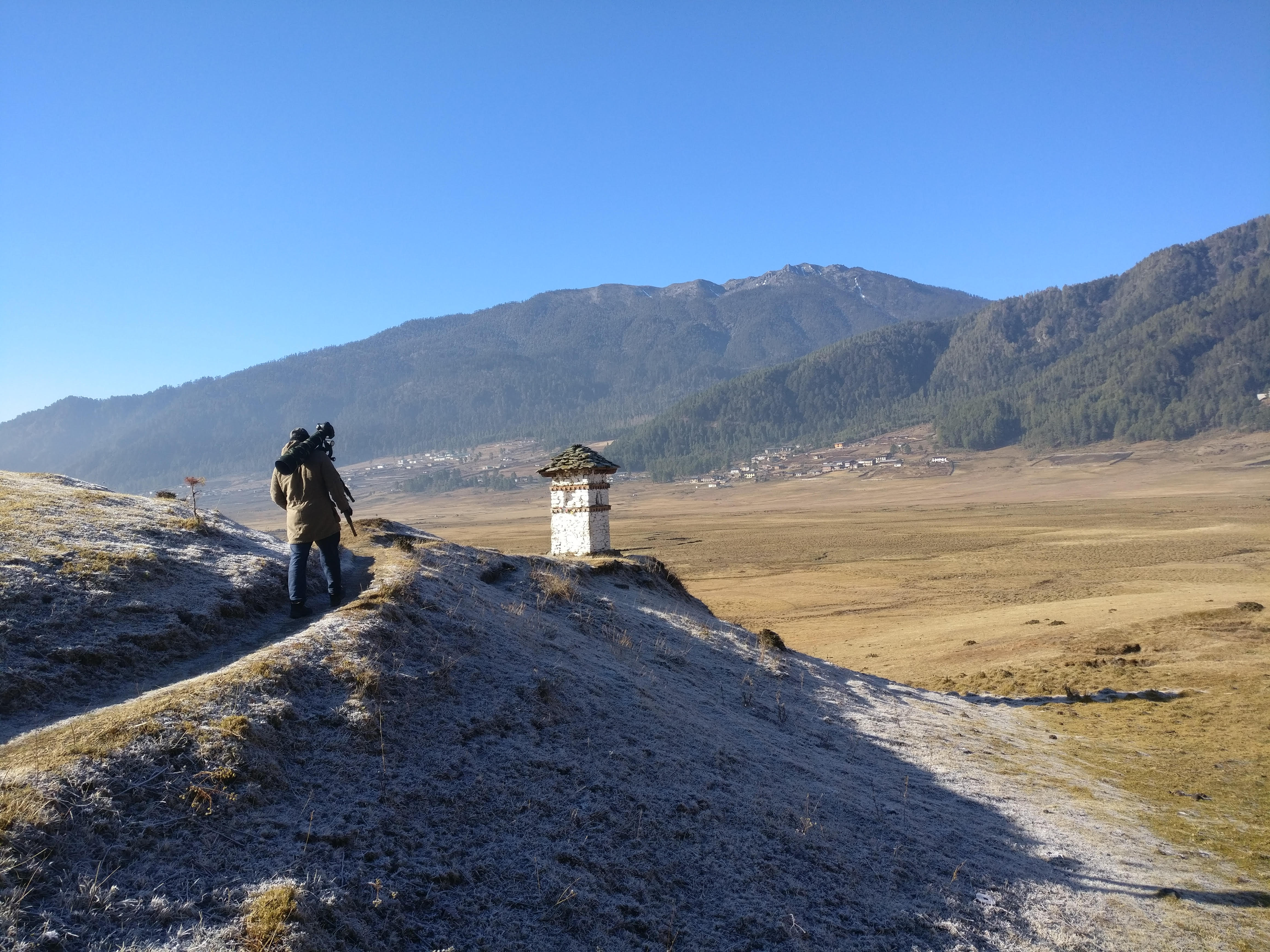
A buddhist stupa on the hiking trail in Phobjikha

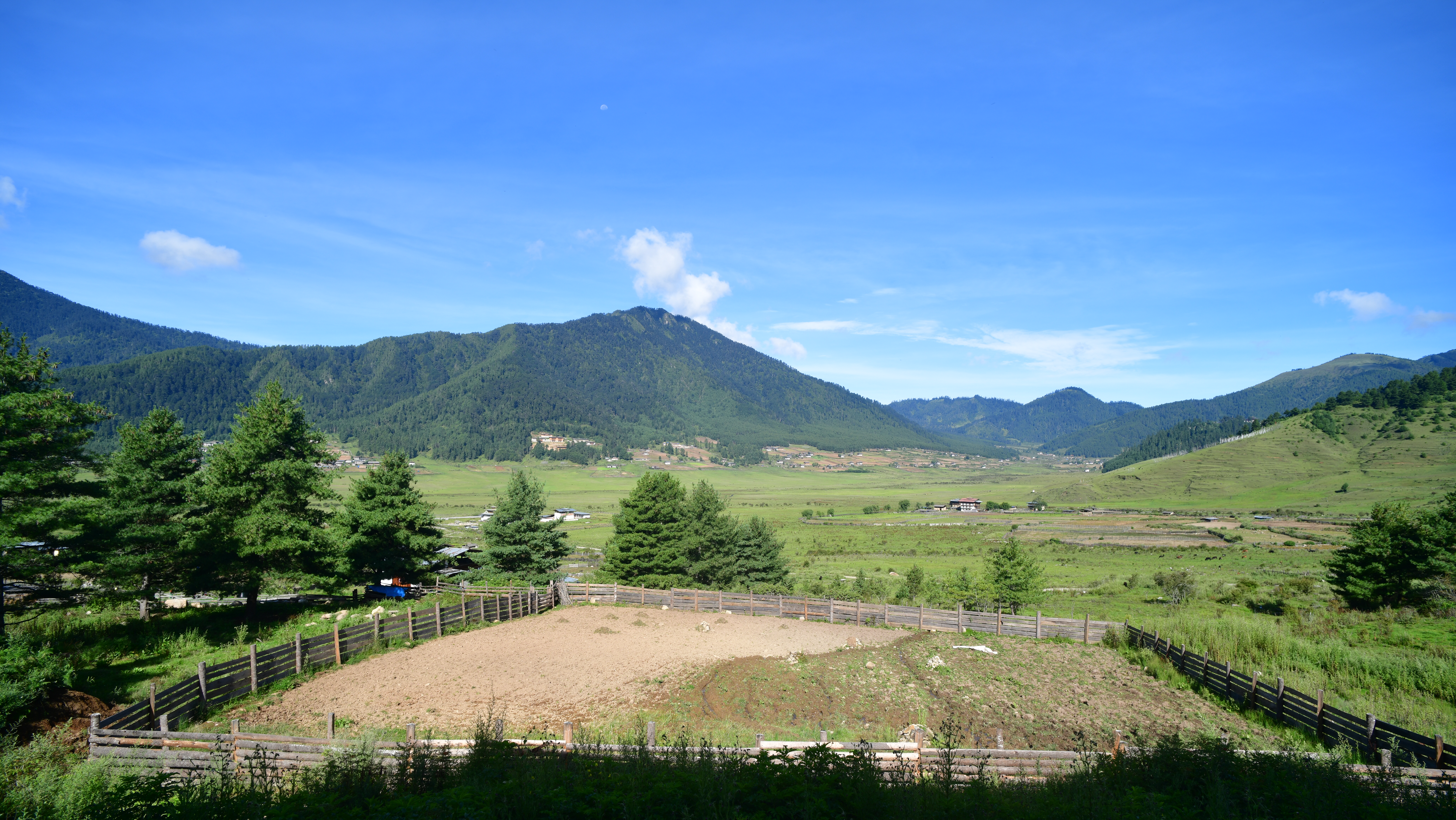
Potato field with stunning view of the valley

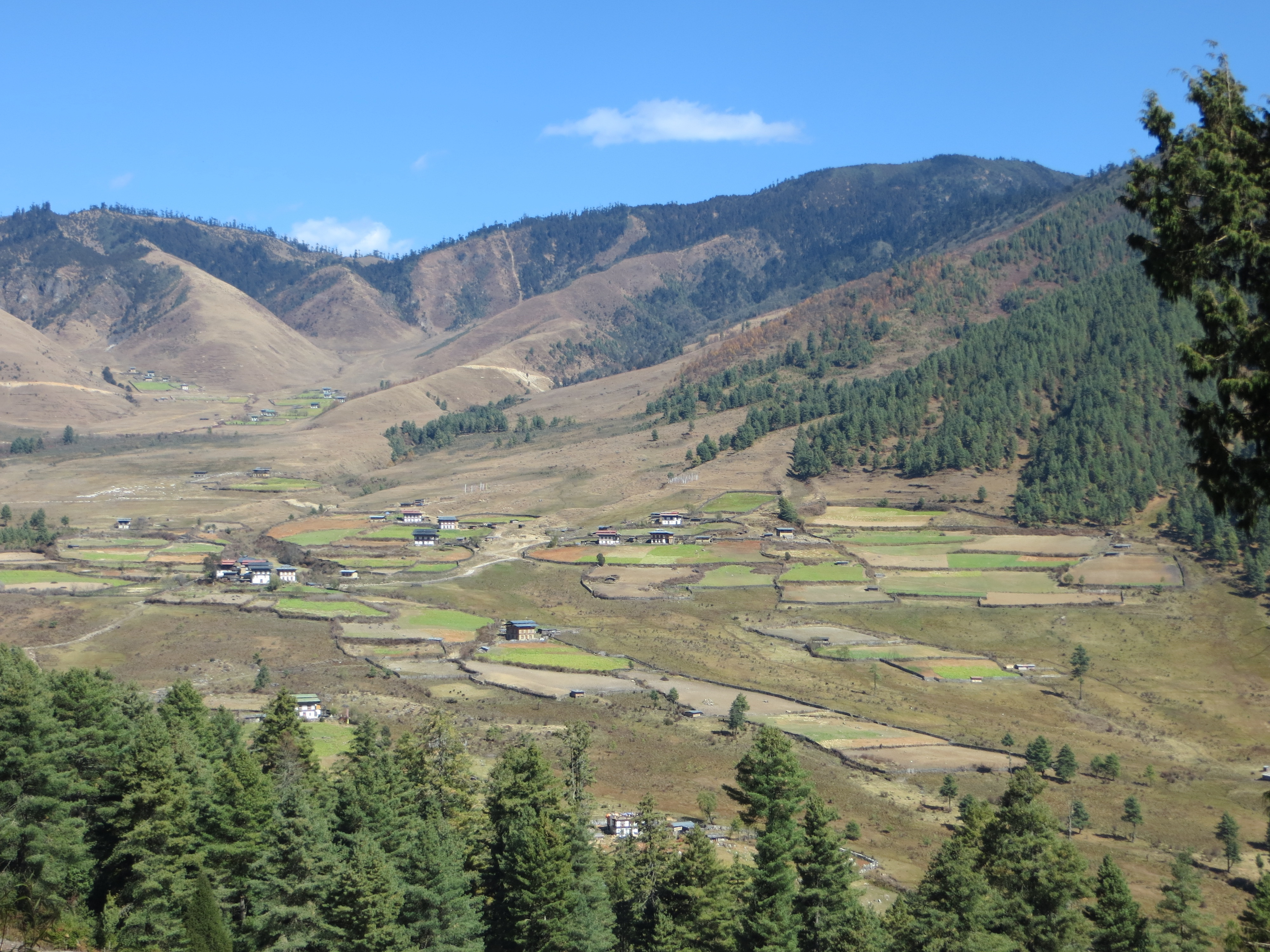
Jangchey and Kumbu villages

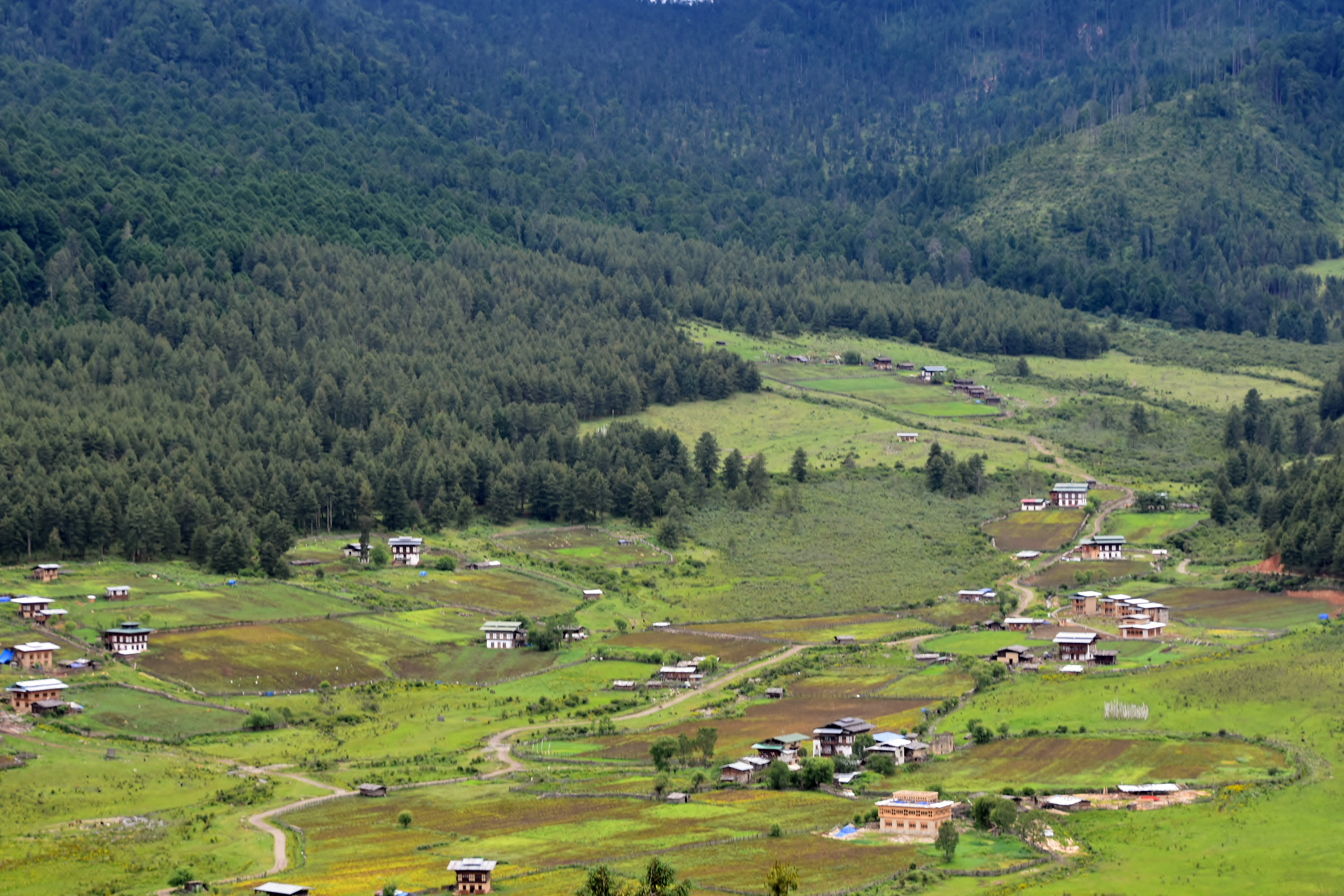
Sangtana village

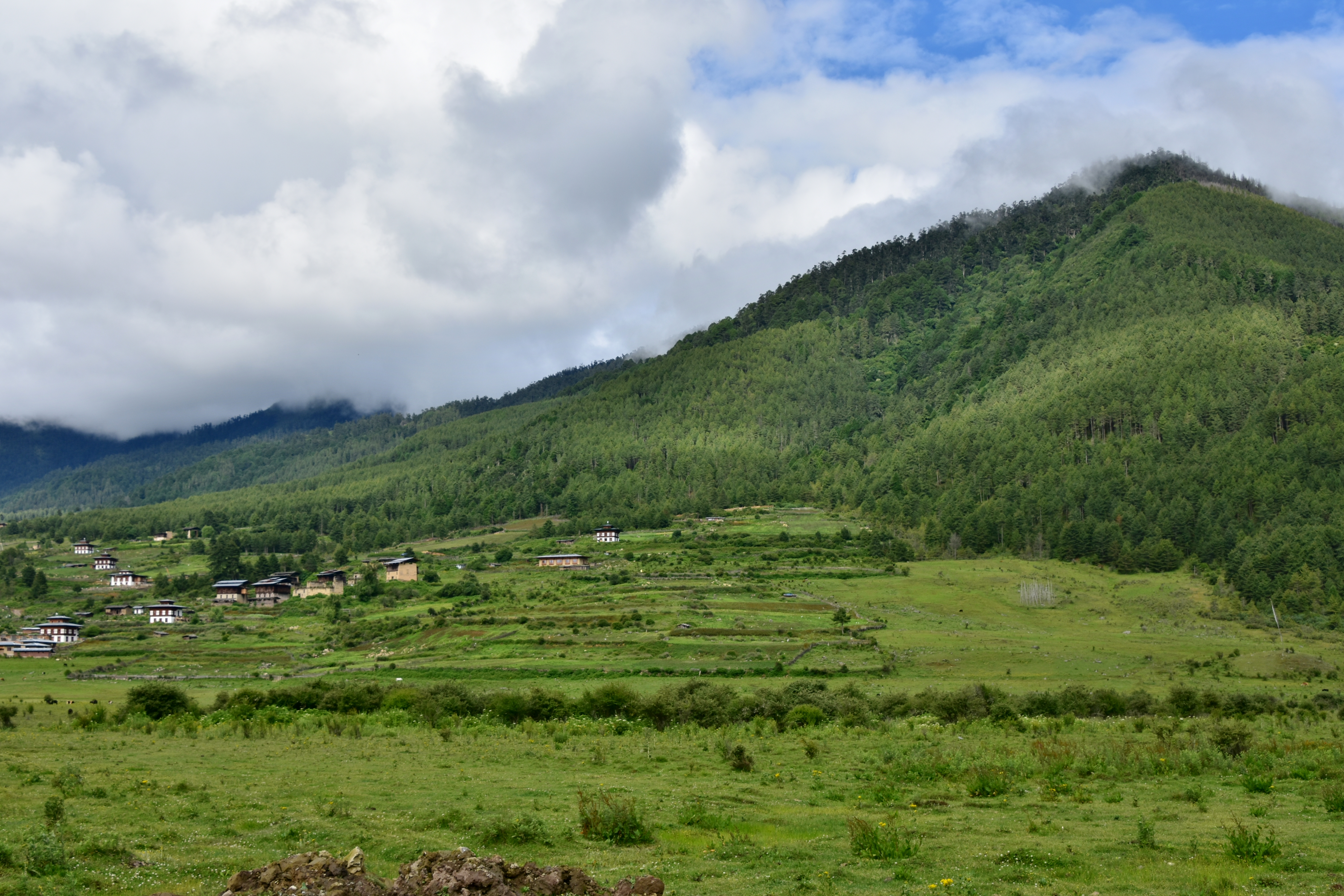
Gophu village in the left side

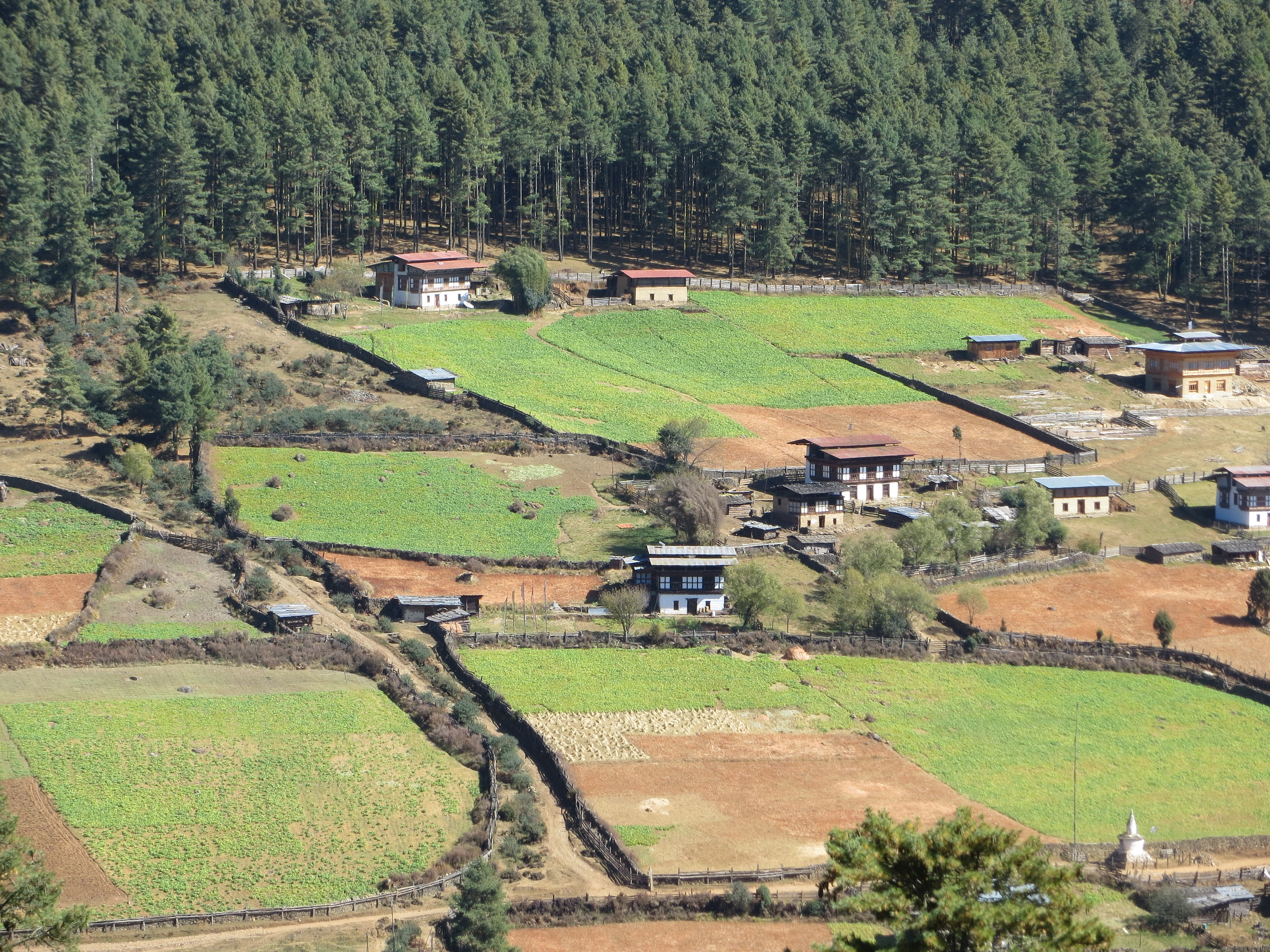
Houses in Semchubara

== See also ==
- Royal Society for the Protection of Nature (RSPN)
- Black Mountains (Bhutan)
- Gangteng Monastery
- Lawa La
