= Gangteng Gewog =

Gangteng Gewog སྒང་སྟེང་
- Gewog
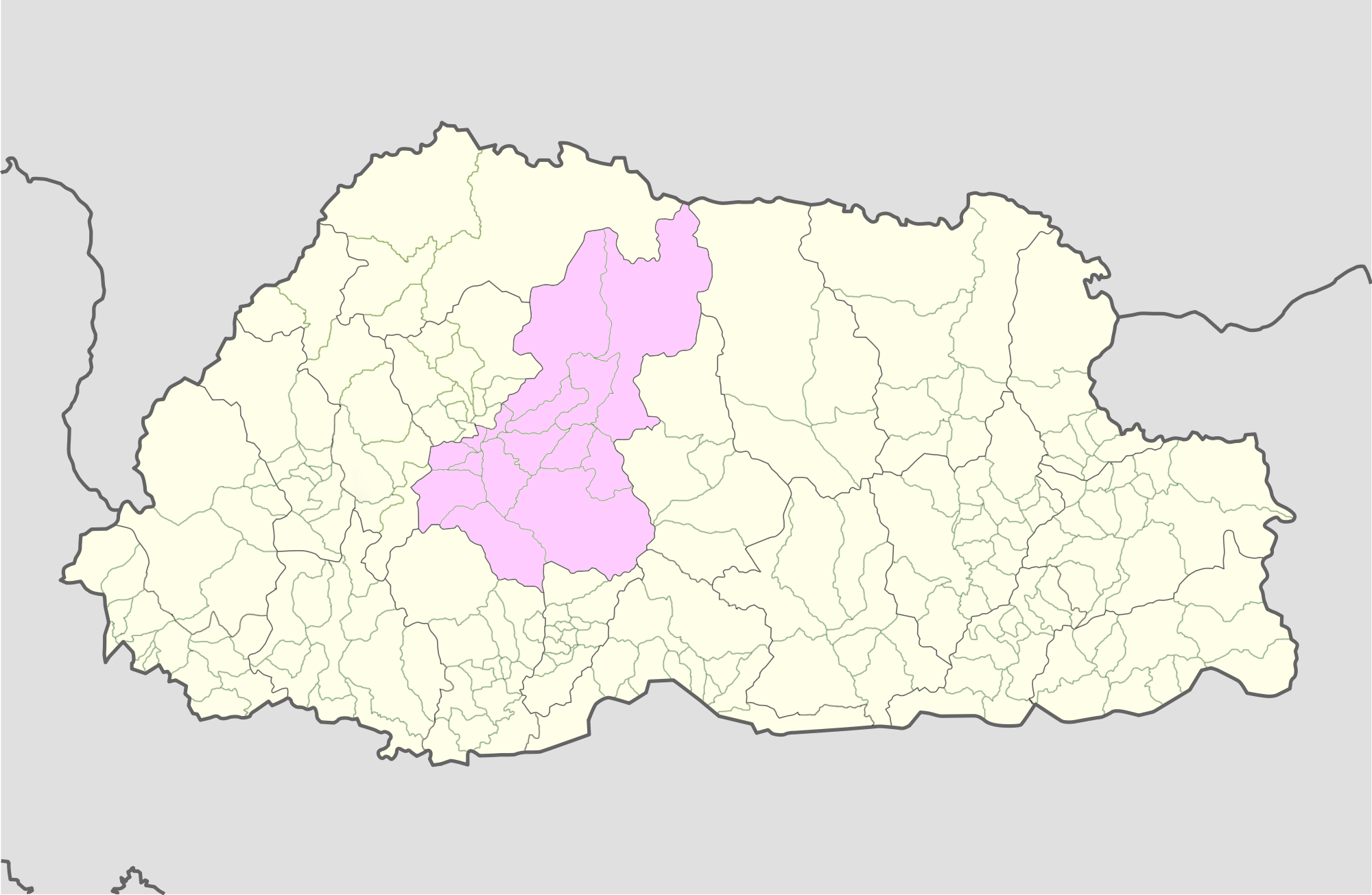
- Country: Bhutan
- District: Wangdue Phodrang District
- Time zone: UTC+6 (BTT)

Gangteng Gewog (Dzongkha: སྒང་སྟེང་) is a gewog (village block) of Wangdue Phodrang District, Bhutan. It used to be known as Gangte or Gangtey.

== See also ==
- Phobjika Valley
