= Phobji Gewog =

Phobji Gewog ཕོབ་སྦྱིས་
- Gewog
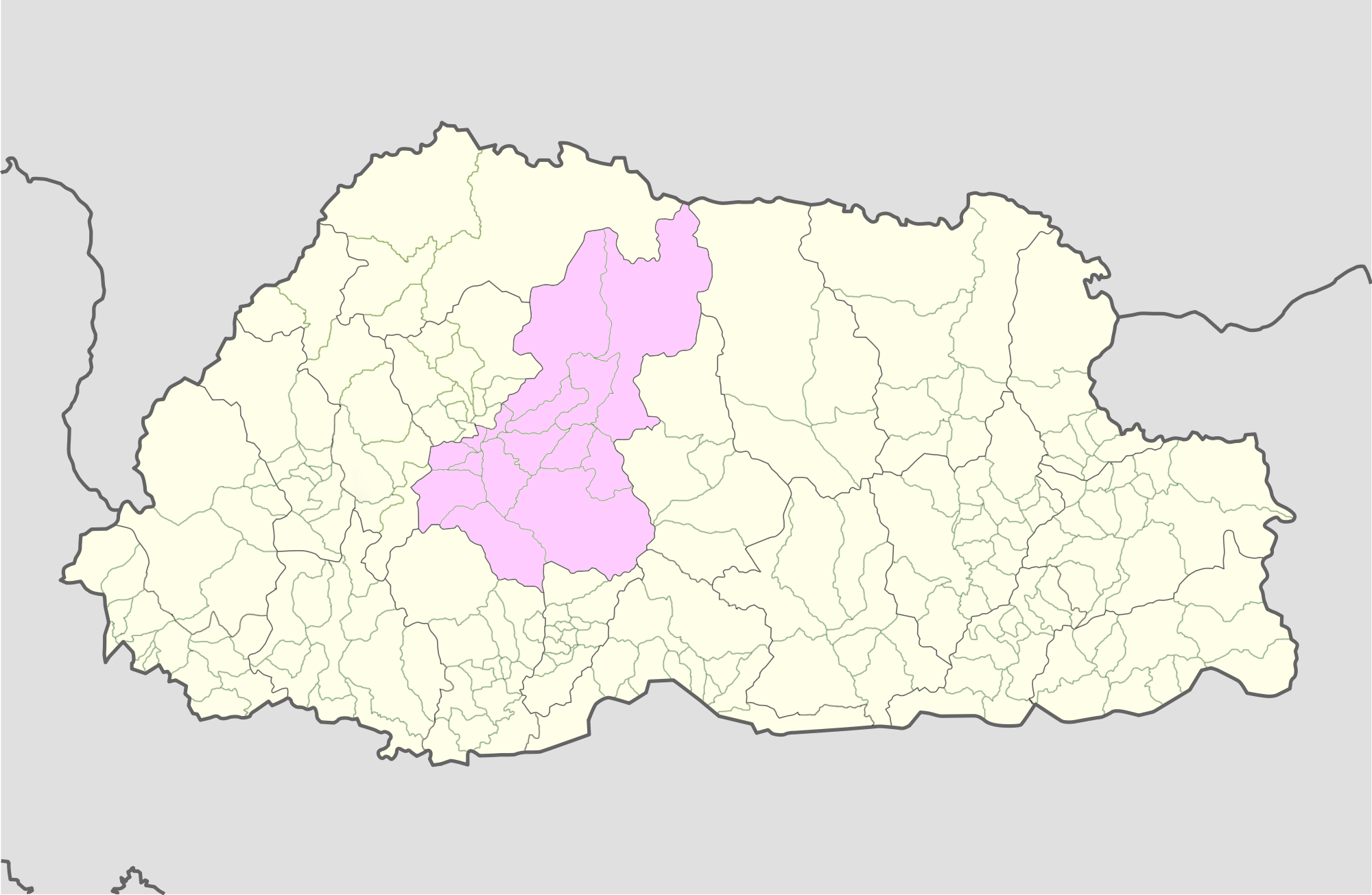
- Country: Bhutan
- District: Wangdue Phodrang District

Area
  - Total: 138.20 km^{2} (53.36 sq mi)
- Time zone: UTC+6 (BTT)

Phobji Gewog (Dzongkha: ཕོབ་སྦྱིས་) is a gewog (village block) of Wangdue Phodrang District, Bhutan. The Gewog is located in the east-central part of the Wangdue Phodrang Dzongkhag.

== See also ==
- Phobjikha Valley
