= Trans Bhutan Trail =

Trail in Bhutan

The Trans Bhutan Trail is a 403-kilometre (250 mi) east–west trail in Bhutan, stretching from Haa to Trashigang and crossing 27 gewogs across nine dzongkhags.

== Origins ==
Dating back to the 16th century, the trails, used by rulers, monks, pilgrims, traders and message carriers known as garps, were the only way to travel across Bhutan. The trail fell into disuse and disrepair after the construction of Bhutan's first national highway in 1962; much of it was subsumed by the new roads.

== Restoration ==
The project to restore the trail began in 2018, led by the Bhutan Canada Foundation, the government of Bhutan and the Trans Bhutan Trail organisation, a non-profit formed for the project. It involved restoring or rebuilding 18 major bridges, more than 10,000 steps, and placing QR codes that can be used to access the local area's history. About 900 workers furloughed during the COVID-19 pandemic helped with the project. In a ceremony in Thimphu, Prince Jigyel Ugyen Wangchuck formally opened the trail to tourists on 28 September 2022, coinciding with the resumption of international tourism after the pandemic. The Trans Bhutan Trail organisation runs trips along the route, with the proceeds going towards conserving the route and helping local communities. Many other tour operators also run trips along the trail.

== Route ==
The restored Trans Bhutan Trail spans a total of 403-kilometre (250 mi) from west to east, connecting 400 cultural and historic sites across the country. The trail begins at Haa in the west and ends at Trashigang in the east. The trail traverses through 27 gewogs (local governments) spread across nine dzongkhags (districts). The trail passes through landmarks like Dochula Pass, Punakha Dzong and Trongsa Dzong.
