= Samtengang Central School =

Location
- Samtengang; Wangdue Phodrang; Bhutan

Information
- Type: Government School
- Motto: Towards excellence
- Religious affiliation: Buddhist
- Established: 1962
- Principal: 17617982
- Principal: Ganga Ram Gurung
- Vice Principal: Karma
- Staff: 52 (approx.)
- Gender: Co-educational
- Website: http://smss2011.blogspot.com/

Samtengang Central School (Dzongkha: བསམ་གཏན་སྒང་འབྲིང་རིམ་སློབ་གྲྭ་བར་མ།) is a Government school in Wandue Phodrang, Bhutan for classes PP-X. in Nyisho Gewog It was initially established in 1962 as a Hindi medium community school.

== Samtengang Central School at a glance ==
Samtengang Central School was initially established in 1962 as a Hindi medium community school and consisted of only a few temporary huts. The first Headmaster, appointed by the then Department of Education, was Mr. M.M.Joseph who managed the school along with two Dzongkha lopens (teachers). The oldest infrastructure, which is now a part of the primary school, was constructed in 1964.

In March 1998, the school was upgraded to a Lower Secondary with the construction of boarding facilities. Classes ranged from PP (pre-primary) to VIII. The same year, a new 12 unit building was constructed near the lake which is now referred to as the 'Old Block.' The school upgraded to a Middle Secondary School in 2008, the same year as Bhutan's adoption of a democratic parliamentary system. Classes PP to 6 were allocated to a new location, now serving as Samtengang Primary School. Classes IX and X were subsequently added to the school, forming the current class range.

The school has students from Phobjikha, Nobding, Khotokha, Kazhi Gewog, Phangyul, Gangteng Gewog, Nyisho Gewog, and other places. The school has a total area of approximately 20 acres. Samtengang Central School (SCS) is located in Nyishog Gewog, Wangduephodrang Dzongkhag, Bhutan. A mere 21 kilometers from Wangdue town, Samtengang can be reached by rough road from Chuzomsa or on foot from Teki Zampa. Sitting atop a mountain plateau, Samtengang has an encompassing view of Wangdue town, Phung Yul, and Kazhi. The campus includes a lake that is home to various species of fish as well as avian wildlife.

SCS plays host to classes VII, VIII, IX and X with a total of 20 separate sections. Students can participate in various sports such as: football, basketball, volleyball, table tennis, tae kwon do, and badminton. In addition, Samtengang has a club atmosphere that includes: UNESCO, Culture, Games and Sports, Driglam Namzha, Maths And Science, Health, DAISAN, Knitting GNH, Home Science etc. clubs.

== Clubs ==
1. Gross national happiness Club
2. Nature Club
3. Etiquette Club
4. UNESCO Club
5. Culture Club
6. Games and Sports Club
7. Arts and Crafts Club
8. Maths and Science Club
9. Health Club
10. Home Science club

== See also ==
- Samtengang
