= Samtengang =

Samtengang བསམ་གཏན་སྒང
- Location in Bhutan
- Coordinates: 27°32′N 90°0′E
- Country: Bhutan
- District: Wangdue Phodrang District
- Village block: Nyisho Gewog
- Time zone: UTC+6 (BTT)

Samtengang is a town in Wangdue Phodrang District in central Bhutan.

== See also ==
Samtengang Middle Secondary School
