= Adha Tsho =

Pilgrimage place and Lake in Bhutan

- ཨ་ཐང་མཚོ། (Dzongkha)
- Location within Bhutan
- Location: Wangdue Phodrang District, Bhutan
- Coordinates: 27°17′32.92″N 90°06′32.49″E
- Surface area: 2.38 hectares (5.9 acres)
- Surface elevation: 1,300 metres (4,300 ft)

Adha Tsho is a natural low altitude lake and pilgrimage place located near a paddy field in Athang Gewog of Wangdue Phodrang District in Bhutan.

== Area ==
The surface area of the Adha Tsho is 2.38 ha and situated at an altitude of 1300 m from sea level. The lake is surrounded by broadleaved forest on the east and west and paddy fields on the northern side.

== Cultural significance ==
The Adha Tsho or also known as the Adha Pemai Thangka Tsho is believed to be the home for a mermaid which came from a higher altitude lake below Pelela in Wangdue Phodrang.

== Conservation significance ==
The Adha Lake with the Punatsangchhu in the west forms one of the 23 important bird areas in Bhutan. The lake is inside the Jigme Singye Wangchuck National Park. The lake is one of the important water holes within the area for the wild animals and migratory birds. The lake is also an important habitat for the critically endangered White-bellied Heron and the Mountain hawk-eagle. Two species of fishes, Copper Mahseer (Neolissochilus hexagonolepis) and Common Carp are found in the lake.
