= Wache =

Wache may refer to

- Wache Dzong, a fortress in Bhutan
- Die Wache, a German weekly police TV procedural that was broadcast in 1994–2006
- Dimo Wache (born 1973), German football player
- Neue Wache (New Guardhouse), a building in Berlin, Germany
