= Wangdue Phodrang Dzong =

Fortress in Wangdue Phodrang, Bhutan

- དབང་འདུས་ཕོ་བྲང་རྫོང་།
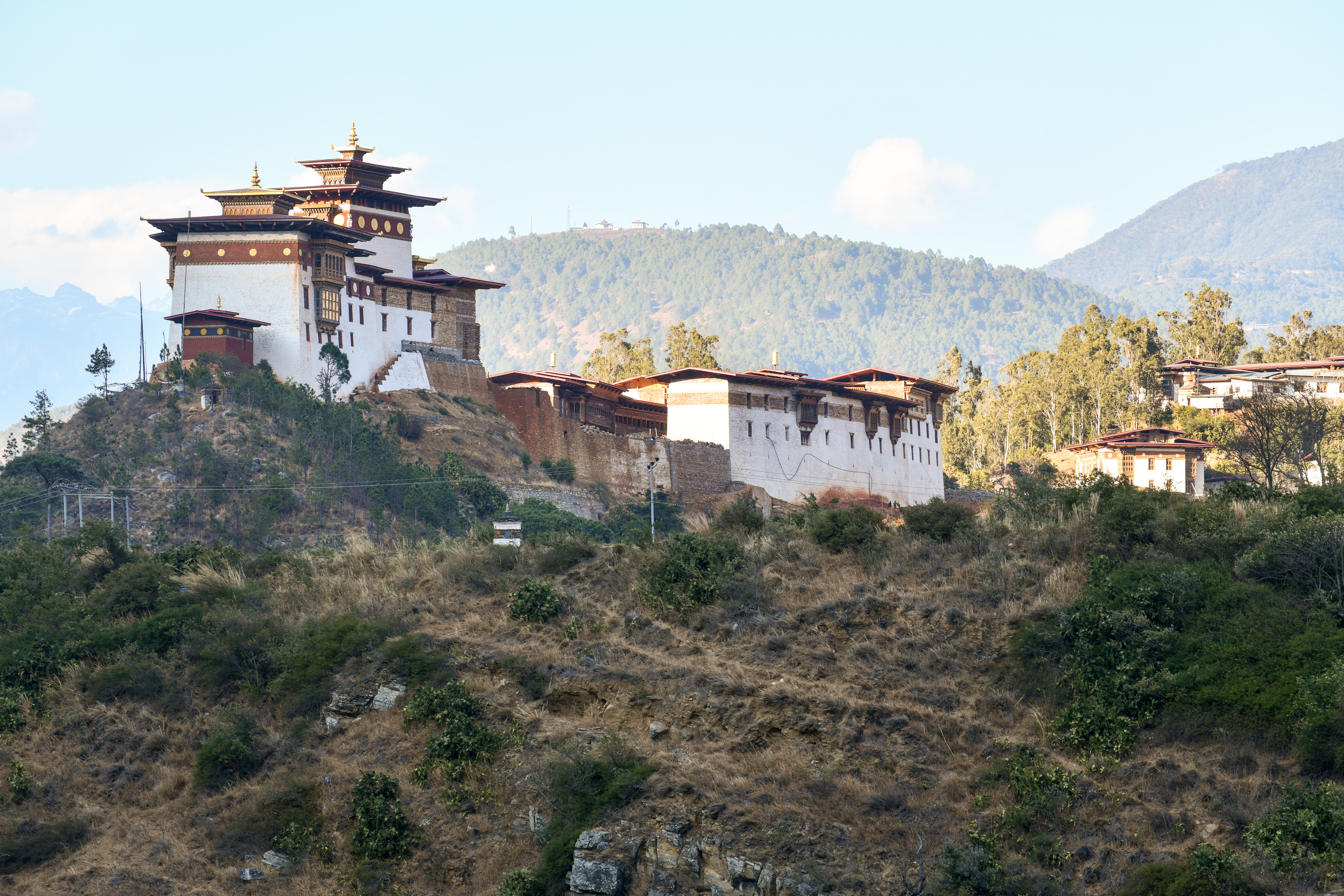
- The dzong in 2019

Religion
- Affiliation: Buddhism

Location
- Location: Wangdue Phodrang
- State: Wangdue Phodrang District
- Country: Bhutan
- Interactive map of Wangdue Phodrang Dzong
- Coordinates: 27°28′30″N 89°53′50″E

Architecture
- Style: Dzong
- Founder: Ngawang Namgyal
- Established: 1638; 388 years ago
- Groundbreaking: 1638
- Completed: 1640
- Elevation: 1,273 m (4,177 ft)

Wangdue Phodrang Dzong (Dzongkha: དབང་འདུས་ཕོ་བྲང་རྫོང་།), also known as the Wangdi Dzong (Dzongkha: དབང་འདི་རྫོང་) is a Buddhist monastery (dzong) in Wangdue Phodrang, Bhutan.

== History ==
The dzong was founded by Ngawang Namgyal in 1638, at the top of a hill at the confluence between the Puna Tsang and Dang rivers to consolidate power and to defend the region. According to legend, Namgyal was inspired to build the dzong when he was approached by an old man in the Chimi Lhakhang, who told him that if he built a dzong in the neck of a ridge resembling a sleeping elephant, he would be able to achieve the unification of Bhutan (known as Drukyul at the time). The construction of the dzong started in 1638 and continued for the next year and a half under the supervision of Penlop Nyama Kukye until it was completed in 1640. In 1683, the dzong was expanded by Tenzin Rabgye. It was later renovated in 1767 by Sonam Lhendrup.

In 1837, the dzong was destroyed due to a fire and subsequently restored. In 1897, the dzong was partially damaged due to an earthquake. The dzong received minor renovations in 1952 and 1983. In 2012, the dzong were listed by the Bhutanese government in the tentative list for UNESCO's world heritage sites, along with the Punakha, Rinpung, Trongsa and Daga Dzongs.

On 24 June 2012, a fire caused by a short circuit completely destroyed the dzong. Reconstruction of the dzong started in 2014 with a joint investment between King Jigme Khesar Namgyel Wangchuck, the Indian government and donations of Bhutanese people.

== Architecture ==
Dzongs are Buddhist monastery fortresses built usually in elevated places. They were built for both spiritual and governance purposes.

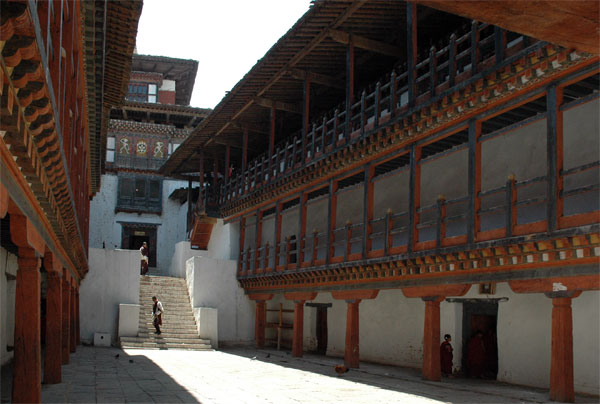
The middle enclosure of the dzong

The dzong sits in the narrow top of a hill between the Puna Tsang and the Dang rivers, at an elevation of approximately 1,200 metres (3,900 ft), with a clear view of the valleys below. It was the third oldest dzong built by Ngawang Namgyal. The dzong was built using stone, wood and mud as the main construction materials. It has three sections: an oblong courtyard in the northeast, an enclosure in the middle used for religious purposes, and a second courtyard in the southwest, with all sections being narrow due to the dzong's location in the constricted summit of a hill. The dzong also features 14 lhakhangs, which were installed during the reconstruction after the 2012 fire.
