= Wache Dzong =

Religion
- Affiliation: Tibetan Buddhism

Location
- Location: Wangdue Phodrang, Bhutan
- Country: Bhutan
- Shown within Bhutan
- Geographic coordinates: 27°28′30″N 89°53′50″E

Architecture
- Style: Bhutanese Dzong
- Founder: 13th century
- Established: Descendants of Sangdag Garton

Wache Dzong is a dzong in Bjena Gewog in Wangdue Phodrang, Bhutan. The dzong was built in the 13th century by descendants of Sangdag Garton, son of Phajo Drugum Zhigpo. Reconstruction works for the dzong was started in 2011 by Khenpo Dorji and was later consecrated by the Je Khenpo on 7 January 2015.

In 2012, Wachen Dzong was included in Bhutan's tentative list for inscription on the UNESCO World Heritage List.
