= Chitishio Dzong =

Chitishio
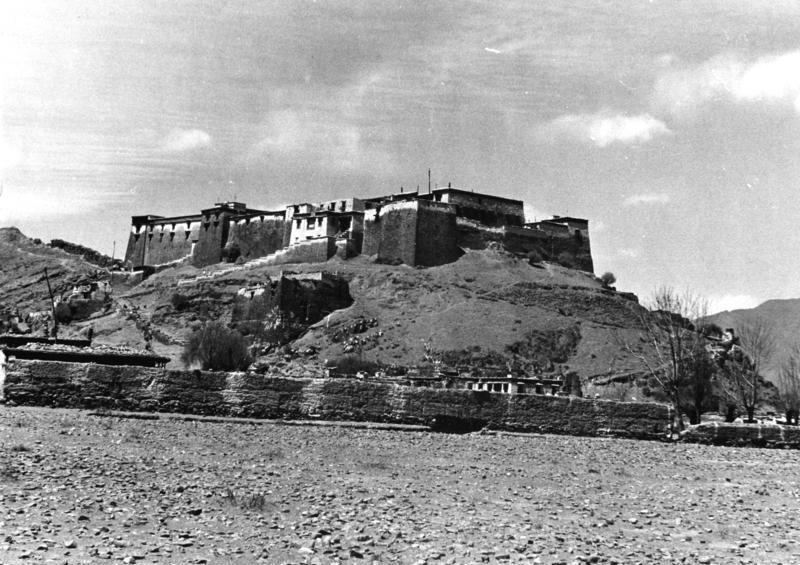
- Chitishio Dzong, 1939

- Location within Tibet Autonomous Region

Religion
- Affiliation: Tibetan Buddhism

Location
- Location: Tibet Autonomous Region, China
- Country: China
- Interactive map of Chitishio
- Coordinates: 29°16′37″N 91°06′40″E

Chitishio is a dzong in Tibet. The site is in ruins; it was a Buddhist monastery.
