= Phangyuel Gewog =

Phanguyl Gewog ཕངས་ཡུལ་
- Gewog
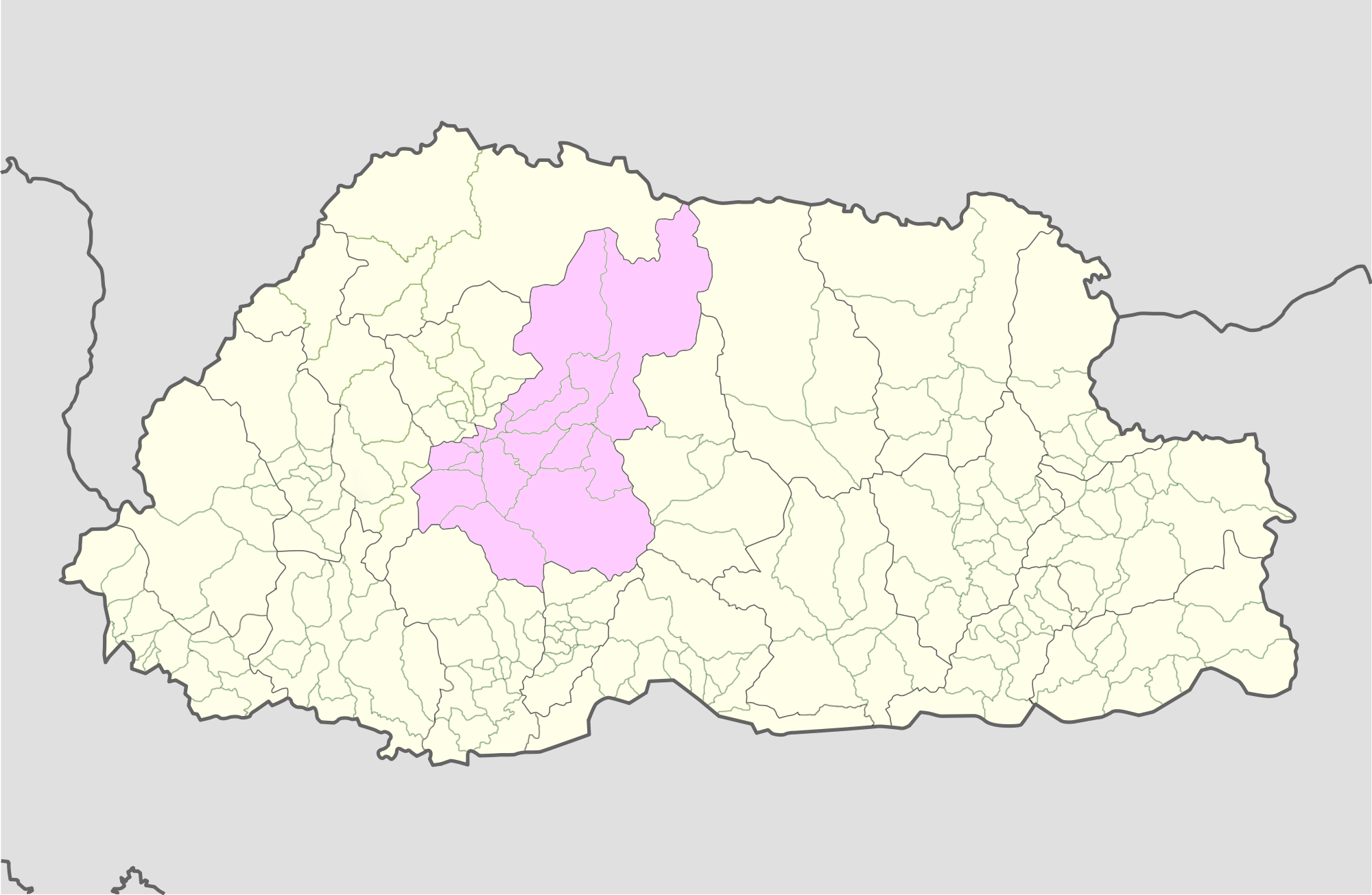
- Country: Bhutan
- District: Wangdue Phodrang District
- Time zone: UTC+6 (BTT)

Phangyul Gewog (Dzongkha: ཕངས་ཡུལ་) is a gewog (village block) of Wangdue Phodrang District, Bhutan.
