= Bjendag Gewog =

Bjena Gewog སྦྱེད་ནག་
- Gewog
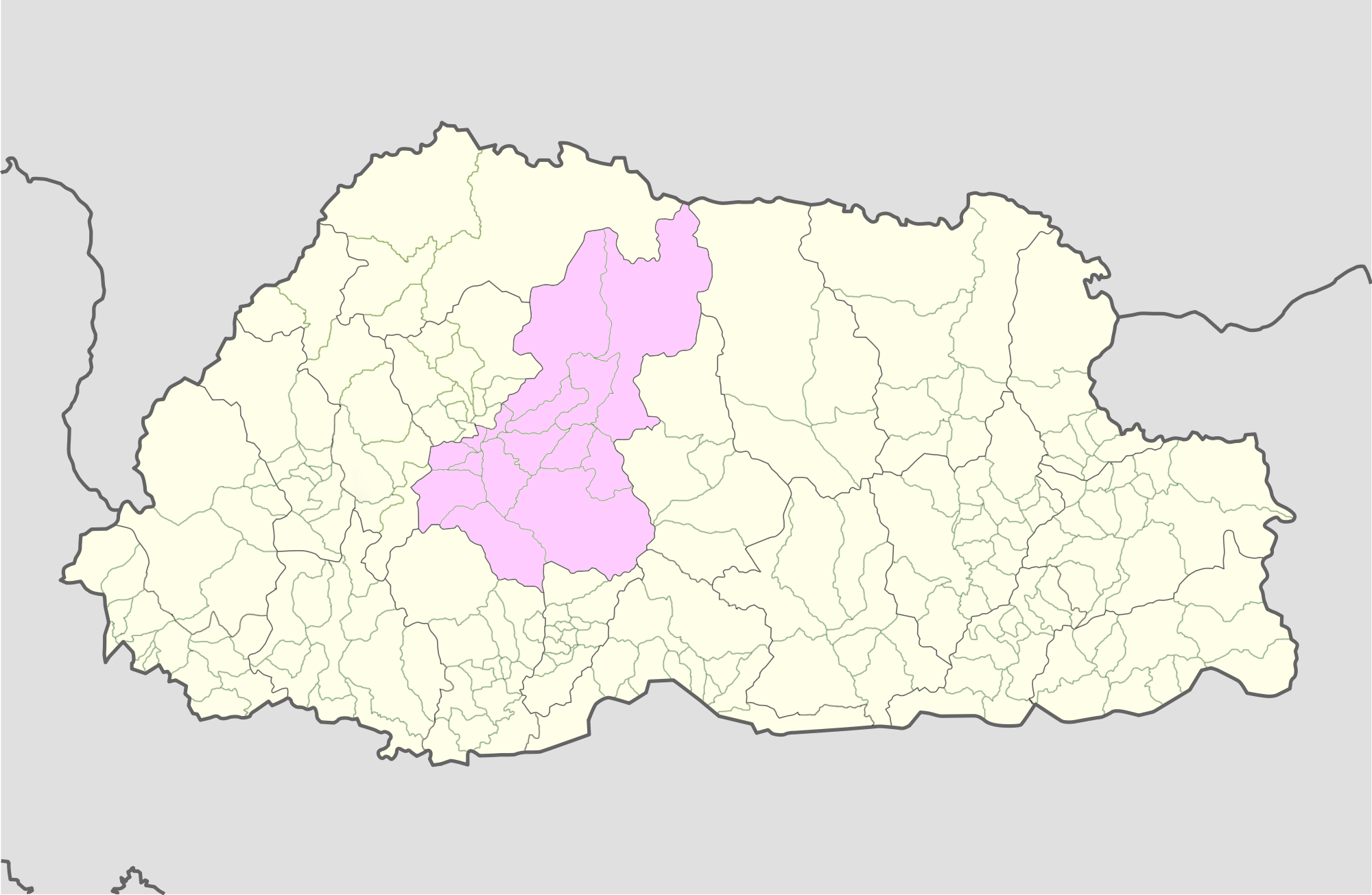
- Country: Bhutan
- District: Wangdue Phodrang District
- Time zone: UTC+6 (BTT)

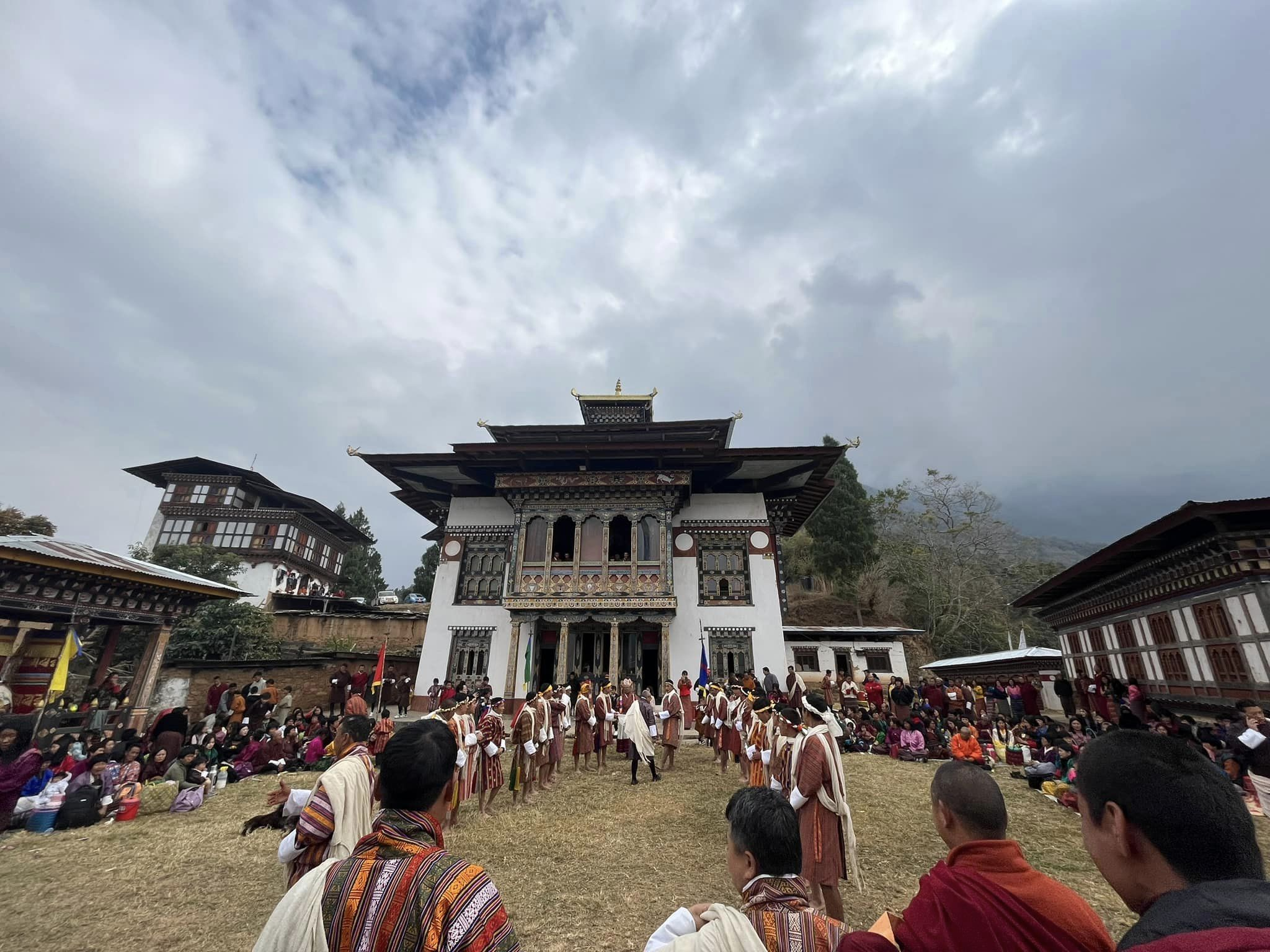
Balakha. Bjena

Bjendag Gewog (Dzongkha: སྦྱེད་ནག་) (or Bjena) is a gewog (village block) of Wangdue Phodrang District, དབང་འདུས་ཕོ་བྲང་། Bhutan. The Bjendag Gewog is located 1350-3400m above sea level, 15km away from the Dzongkhag Centre. It has a population of 2470, consisting of 1220 males and 1250 females. Bjendag is considered a 'sloppy' area, as the soil is predominantly sandy loam and land use is generally dry and wet land farming. There are 5 Chiwogs in Bjendag:

1) Phuentsho Gang (ཕུན་ཚོགས་སྒང)

2) Tashitokha (བཀྲིས་ཏོ་ཁ)

3) Wache (ཝ་ཅད)

4) Themakha

5) Khatokha

Houses are of mainly traditional type made up stone and wood. The primary source of income are cash crops such as potato and other vegetables.

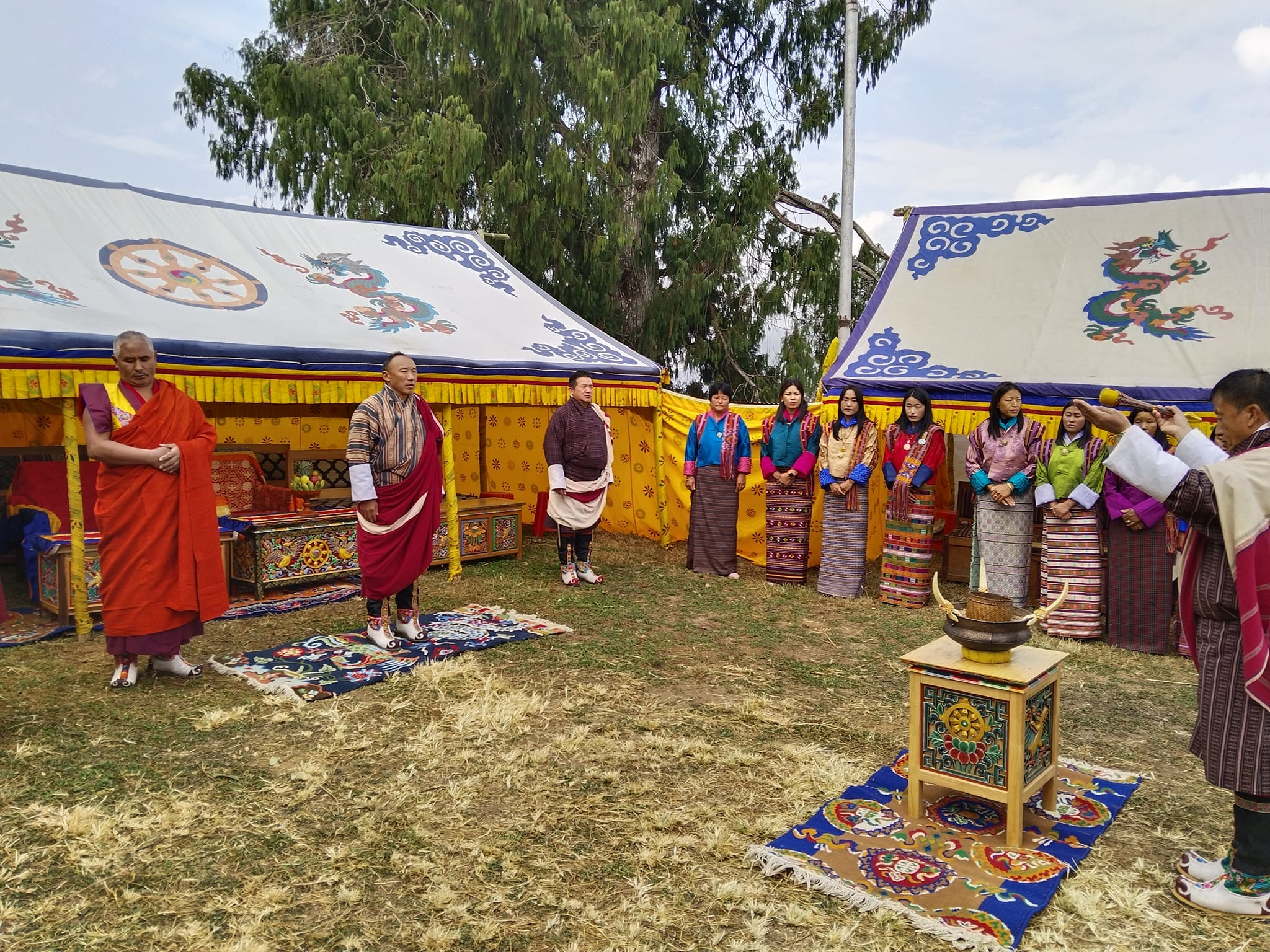
During the bala bong ko at bjena

Wache Dzong is located here. The Gewog also has one of the four sacred cliffs of Phajo Drugom Zhigpo known as Dechen Draphu here.
