= Ruepisa Gewog =

Ruepisa Gewog རུས་སྦིས་ས་
- Gewog
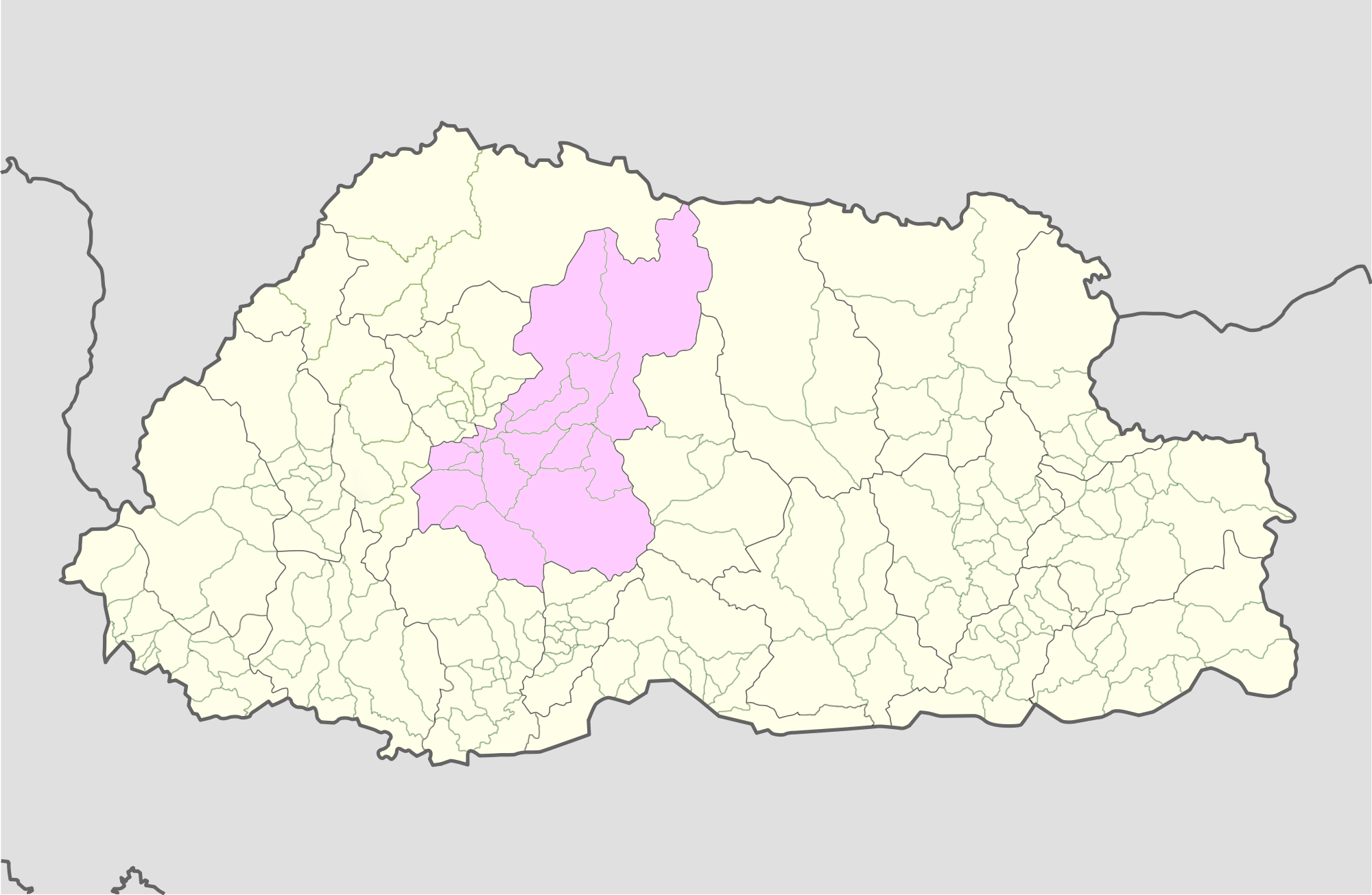
- Country: Bhutan
- District: Wangdue Phodrang District
- Time zone: UTC+6 (BTT)

Ruepisa Gewog (Dzongkha: རུས་སྦིས་ས་) is a gewog (village block) of (Dzongkha: དབང་འདུས་ཕོ་བྲང་རྫོང་ཁ།) Wangdue Phodrang District, Bhutan.

== Phoetsi goenpa ==
It was founded by(Dzongkha: ཨ་ནི་དཔལ་དཀར་ཆོས་འཛོམས།) Ani Pekar Chozom during the 15th century. On the ridge further ahead of the temple can be seen traces of her body cremation.
