= Gasetsho Om Gewog =

Gasetsho Wom Gewog དགའ་སེང་ཆོ་འོགམ་
- Gewog
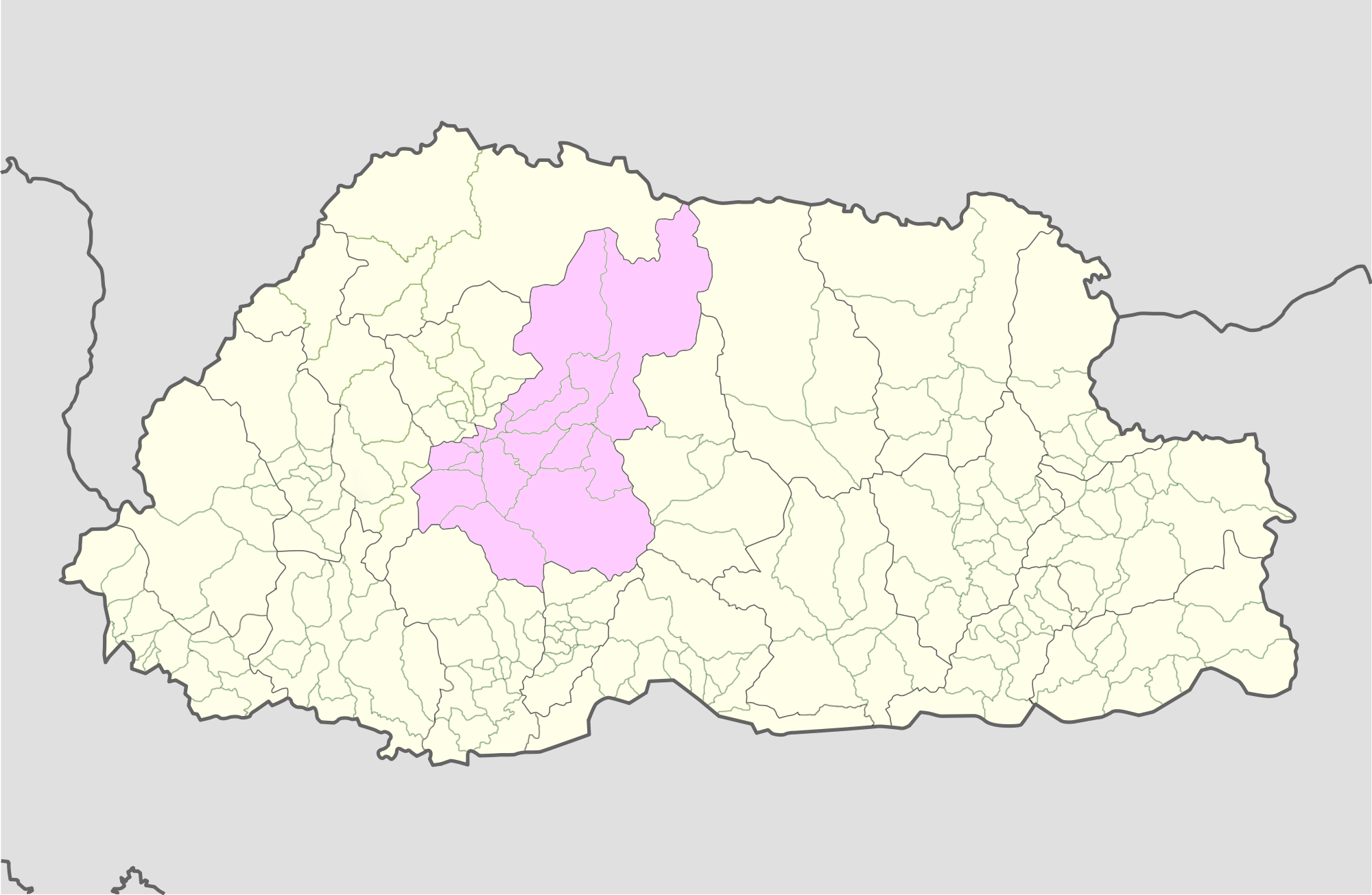
- Country: Bhutan
- District: Wangdue Phodrang District
- Time zone: UTC+6 (BTT)

Gasetsho Wom Gewog (Dzongkha: དགའ་སེང་ཆོ་འོགམ་) is a gewog (village block) of Wangdue Phodrang District, Bhutan.
