= Nahi Gewog =

Nahi Gewog ན་ཧི་
- Gewog
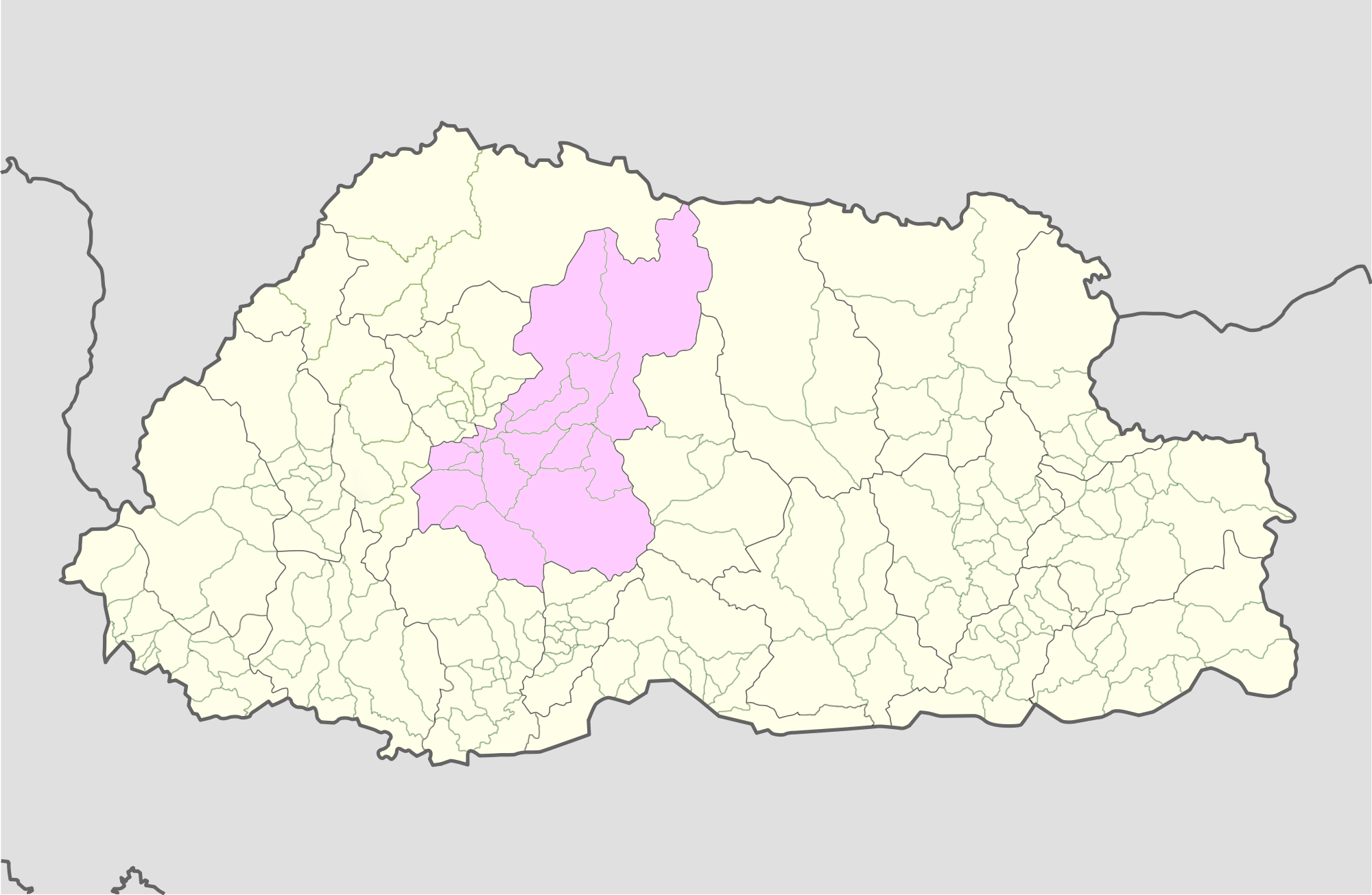
- Country: Bhutan
- District: Wangdue Phodrang District
- Time zone: UTC+6 (BTT)

Nahi Gewog (Dzongkha: ན་ཧི་) is a gewog (village block) of Wangdue Phodrang District, Bhutan.
