= Tseshinang =

- Location in Bhutan
- Coordinates: 27°45′N 90°4′E
- Country: Bhutan
- District: Wangdue Phodrang District
- Time zone: UTC+6 (BTT)

Tseshinang is a town in Wangdue Phodrang District in central Bhutan.
