= Gasetsho Gom Gewog =

Gaetsho Gom Gewog དགའ་སེང་ཚོ་གོངམ་
- Gewog
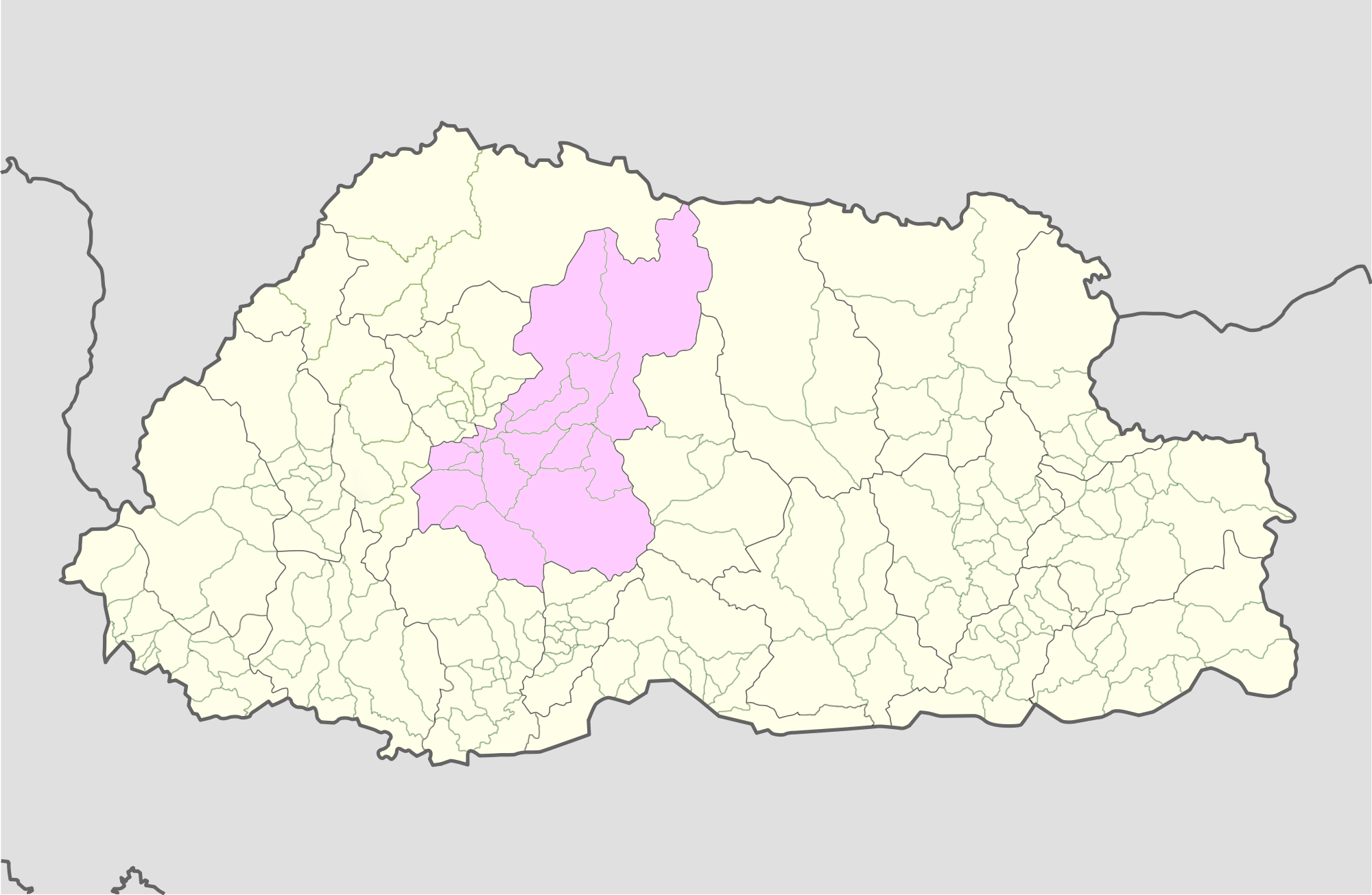
- Country: Bhutan
- District: Wangdue Phodrang District
- Time zone: UTC+6 (BTT)

Gasetsho Gom Gewog (Dzongkha: དགའ་སེང་ཚོ་གོངམ་) is a gewog (village block) of Wangdue Phodrang District, Bhutan.
