= Dangchu Gewog =

Dangchu Gewog དྭངས་ཆུ་
- Gewog
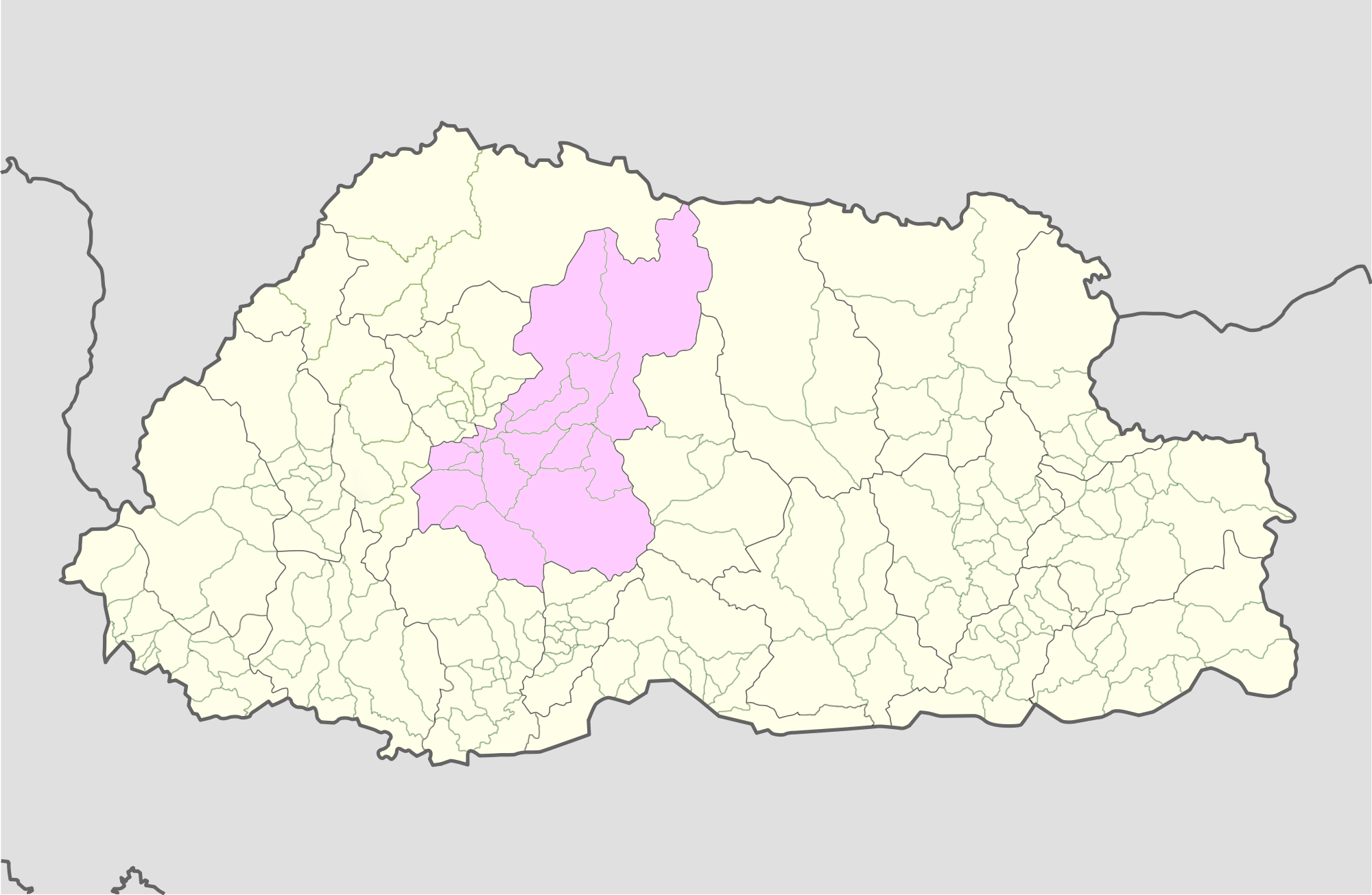
- Country: Bhutan
- District: Wangdue Phodrang District
- Time zone: UTC+6 (BTT)

Dangchu Gewog (Dzongkha: དྭངས་ཆུ་) is a gewog (village block) of Wangdue Phodrang District, Bhutan.
