= Kazhi Gewog =

Kazhi Gewog ཀ་གཞི་
- Gewog
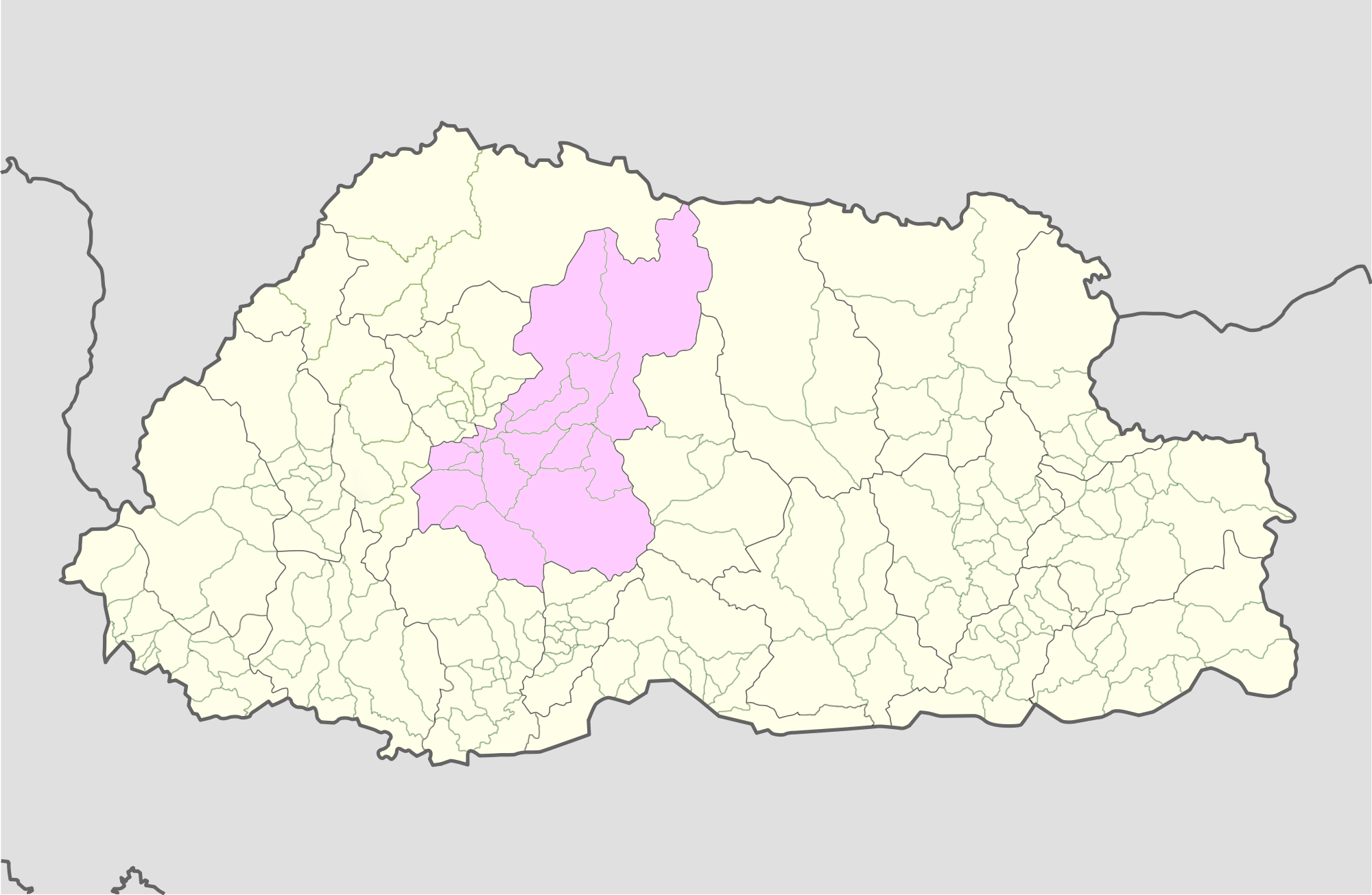
- Country: Bhutan
- District: Wangdue Phodrang District
- Time zone: UTC+6 (BTT)

Kazhi Gewog (Dzongkha: ཀ་གཞི་) is a gewog (village block) of Wangdue Phodrang District, Bhutan. In Kazhi Gewog there was a Lhakhang called Dechen Choling Lhakhang. It was founded by Drubthob Sangye Gyeltshen, the heart son of Rigzin Jigme Lingpa's direct disciple Wang Jigme Kundrol.
