= Wangdue Phodrang =

Town in Wangdue Phodrang, Bhutan

'Wangdi Phodr^{•}a དབང་འདུས་ཕོ་བྲང་ Wangdue Phodrang
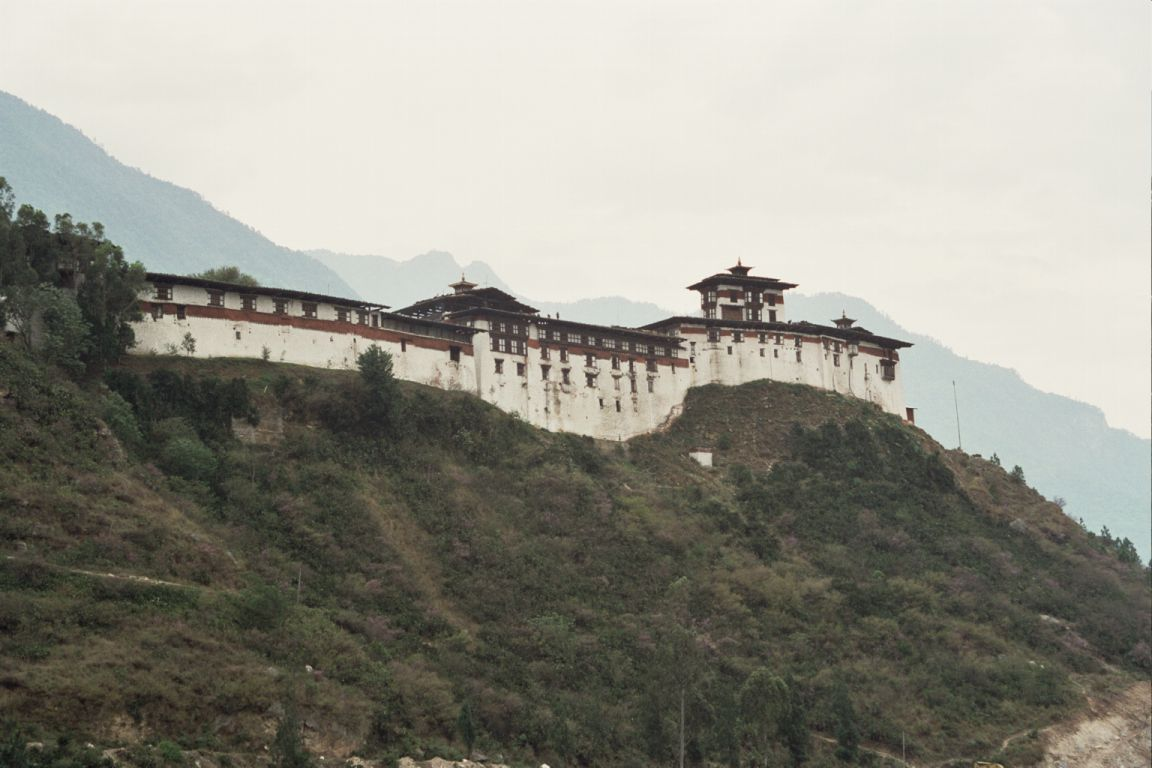
- Dzong at 'Wangdi Phodr'a, Bhutan

- Location in Bhutan
- Coordinates: 27°29′N 89°54′E
- Country: Bhutan
- Dzongkhag: Wangdue Phodrang District
- Gewog: Thedtsho Gewog
- Elevation: 1,273 m (4,177 ft)

Population (2017)
  - Total: 8,954
- Time zone: UTC+6 (BTT)
- Climate: Cwa

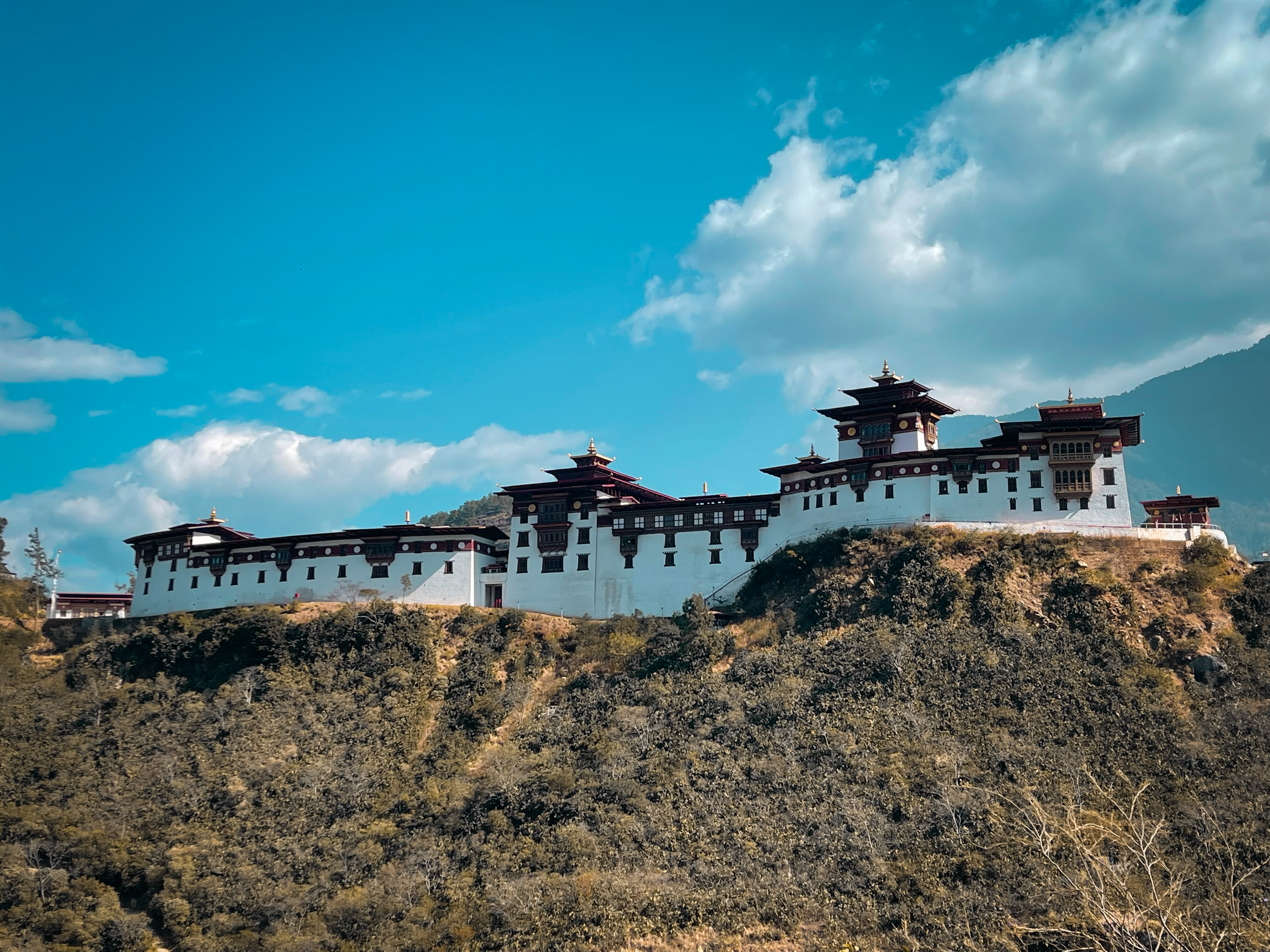
The Paradise of Wangdi Phodrang Bhutan. Captured by kuenzang Tobgay

Wangdue Phodrang (Tibetan: དབང་འདུས་ཕོ་བྲང་, Dzongkha 'Wangdi Phodr'a) is a town and capital (dzongkhag thromde) of Wangdue Phodrang District in central Bhutan. It is located in Thedtsho Gewog. Khothang Rinchenling

== History ==
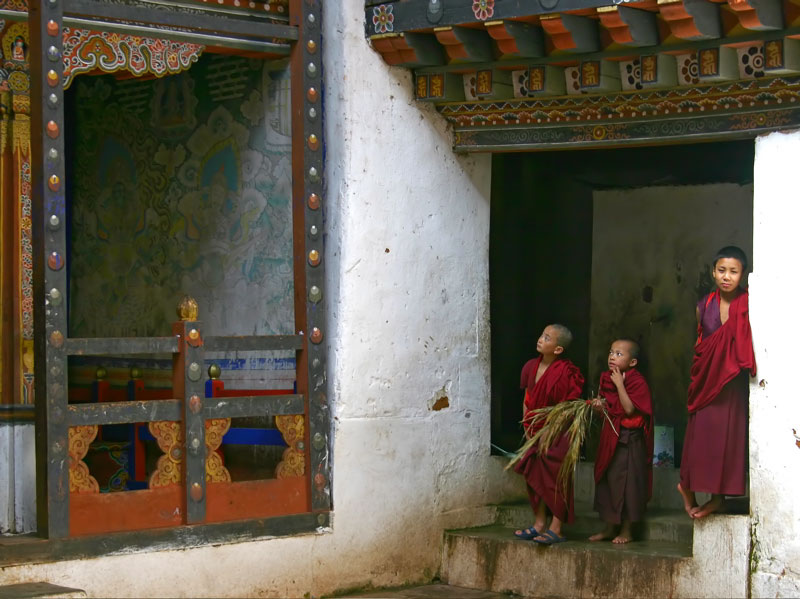
Getsi (novices, Wylie: dge tshul) in Wangdi Phodrang Dzong, Bhutan

The town shares its name with the Wangdue Phodrang Dzong built in 1638 that dominates the district. The name is said to have been given by Ngawang Namgyal, the 1st Zhabdrung Rinpoche, who was searching for the best location for a dzong to prevent incursions from the south. At the chosen spot, the Zhabdrung encountered a boy named Wangdi playing beside the river and hence named the dzong "Wangdi's Palace".

== Fire and reconstruction ==
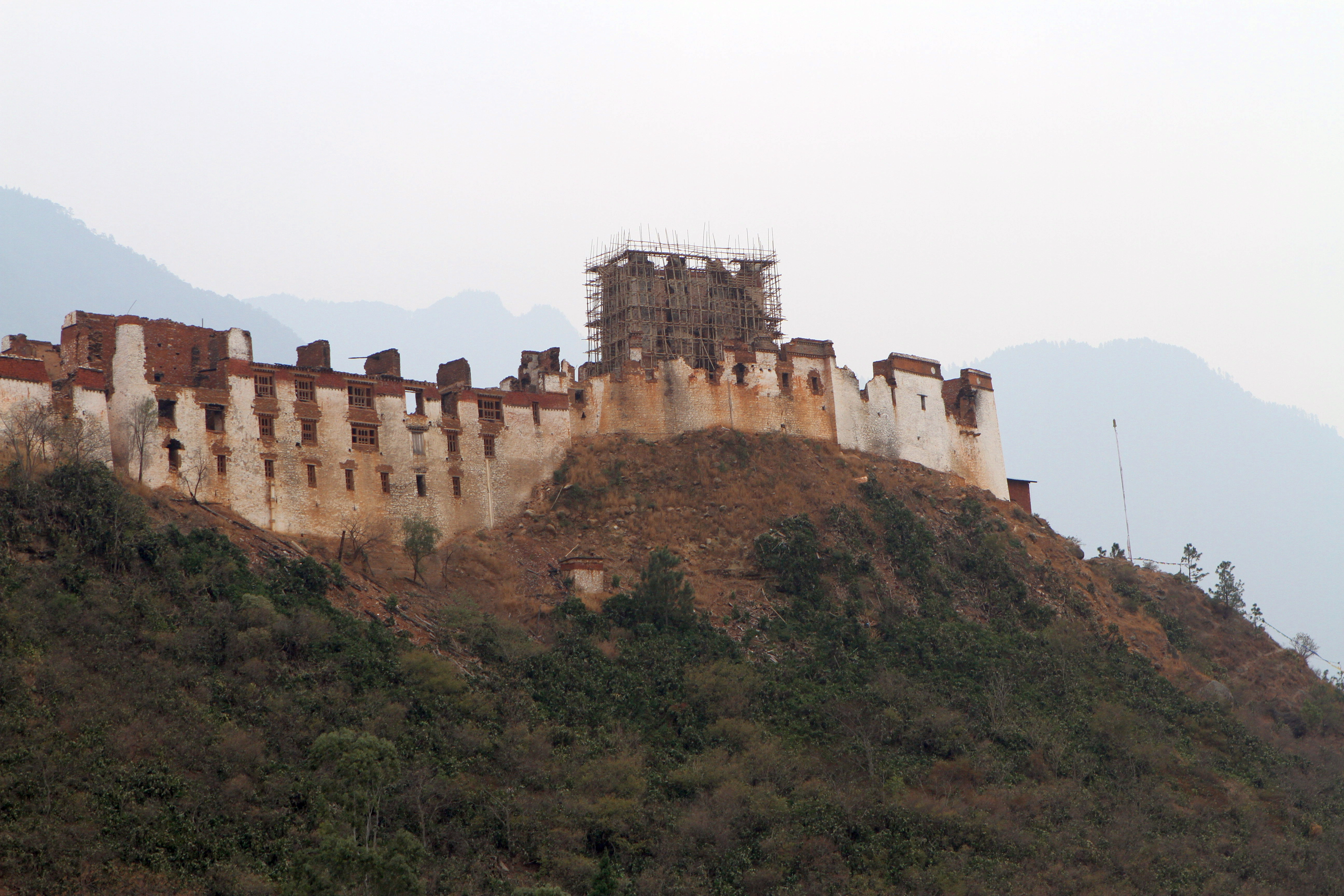
Reconstruction work in February 2013

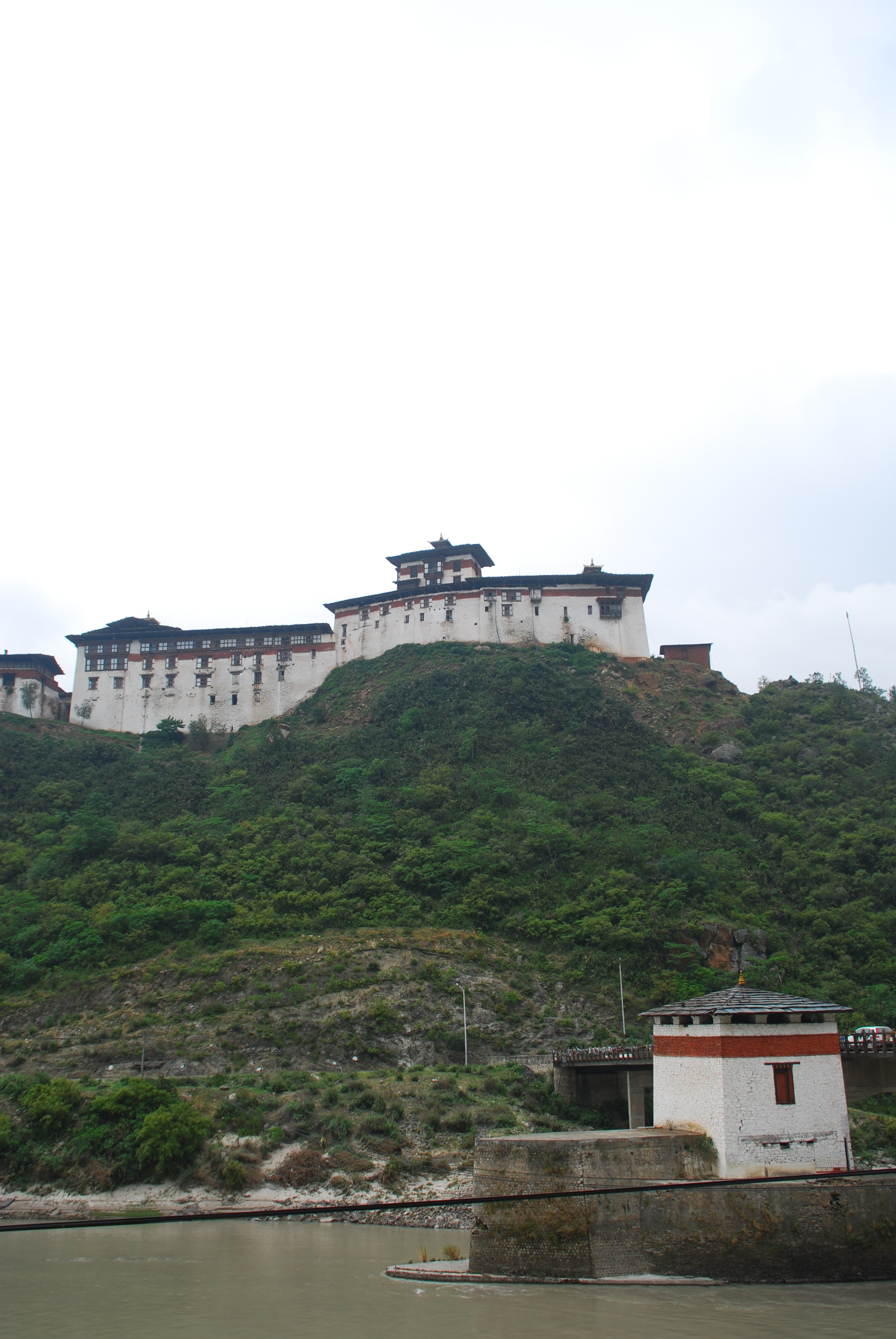
Wangdue Phodrang bridge

Wangdi Phodrang Dzong burnt down in the afternoon of 24 June 2012, supposedly because of a faulty electrical water cooker. However, the dzong was being renovated at the time, so most of the historical relics had already been put into storage and were saved from destruction. Shortly after the fire, more than 1000 Japanese sympathizers donated an equivalent of over US$134,500 to the Wangdue Phodrang Reconstruction Fund.

== Dolung Gonpa ==
Dolung Gonpa is located at the Wangdue. Based on the oral tradition, this monastery is one of several seats founded in different parts of Bhutan around 16th century by Chung Youngzin Ngagi Wangachuk. It was built as practice center of Jangsa Dzong near the village of Khotokha Yulsar.

According to another oral tradition this Goenpa was founded by the 2nd Je khenpo Sonam Yozer, who came to the Je Khenpho throne in the water Rat year of the 11th Rabjung.

Today the Government has started a monastic school at this two-storey monastery.

Situated at 2770 meters above sea level, it can be reached in about fifteen minutes on foot from Khothang Rinchenling Shedra.

== Topology ==
There are three paved roads in Wangdi Phodrang. The Lateral Road enters from the west at Dochula Pass, crosses the Sankosh River (Dzongkha: Puna Tsang Chhu) at Wangdi Phodrang Dzong, and continues east to Tongsa. One spur road heads north from Wangdi Phodrang to Punakha Dzong and slightly beyond. This becomes the footpath to Gasa.

A second spur departs the Lateral Road near the Pele Pass halfway between Wangdi and Tongsa, traveling south a short distance to Gangteng Monastery and the Phobjikha Valley, where rare black-necked cranes may be found. Khothang Rinchenling is one of the eight main seats founded by Kunkhye Longchen Rabjam, the Great Chariot of the Old School of the Early Translation who visited Bhutan in the Fourteenth Century.

== Bridge ==
An interesting story connects the Dzong to the old cantilever bridge that once used to span the Punatsangchu. The bridge was built after the construction of the dzong under the direction of famed mason called Drakpa from Rinchengang village. As a safeguard against flash flood, a mandala dedicated to mithrugpa was installed at the base of the bridge's foundation.

During the tenure of the 20th Wangzop Domchung a big flood washed away the entire bridge, except for the mandala and the base, which were left intact.

It is said the Dzongpon Domchung organized a tshechu with the masked dance, Dolay Raksha.

It was performed to attract the river spirit who was disrupting reconstruction of the bridge. The sprite stayed engrossed in the festivity, Domchung with several hundred men sneaked down to the river and completed the bridge.

The unleashed floods destroyed the bridge, but the Wangzop was very clever, so he had worked with clever design into the foundation pillar to withstand the forces of water.

== Climate ==
Wangdue Phodrang features a dry-winter humid subtropical climate (Köppen)

Climate data for Wangdue Phodrang, 1996–2018
Month	Jan	Feb	Mar	Apr	May	Jun	Jul	Aug	Sep	Oct	Nov	Dec	Year
Mean daily maximum °C (°F)	19.3 (66.7)	20.7 (69.3)	23.8 (74.8)	26.6 (79.9)	28.5 (83.3)	29.5 (85.1)	29.1 (84.4)	29.1 (84.4)	28.4 (83.1)	27.0 (80.6)	23.8 (74.8)	21.0 (69.8)	25.6 (78.0)
Mean daily minimum °C (°F)	5.0 (41.0)	7.7 (45.9)	10.7 (51.3)	14.4 (57.9)	17.6 (63.7)	20.4 (68.7)	20.9 (69.6)	20.7 (69.3)	19.7 (67.5)	15.0 (59.0)	9.8 (49.6)	6.2 (43.2)	14.0 (57.2)
Average precipitation mm (inches)	5.3 (0.21)	6.5 (0.26)	18.4 (0.72)	38.8 (1.53)	66.1 (2.60)	102.6 (4.04)	143.9 (5.67)	135.8 (5.35)	91.3 (3.59)	45.9 (1.81)	3.0 (0.12)	3.3 (0.13)	660.9 (26.03)
Average precipitation days (≥ 0.1 mm)	0.7	1.1	3.5	6.6	9.2	12.1	16.9	16.5	12.0	5.0	0.8	0.5	84.9
Source: World Meteorological Organization

=== Rubesa Gewog ===
Rubesa Gewog is located opposite Wangdi Phodrang Dzong. It consists of six chiwogs and covers an area of approximately 163.6 sq. km. The population is about three thousand people, distributed across a total of 309 households. The gewog has two schools: Jalla Primary School and Bangteykha Primary School, as well as one BHU located at Jalla Chiwog.

=== Hahi Gewog ===
Hahi Gewog is located in the south western parts of Wangdue Phodrang Dzong. The total area of 6470 hectares or 64.7 sq.km. It consists of Five chiwogs with an estimated population of 1200 people.There are one School called Nahi Primary School, Build in 1980.
