= Thedtsho Gewog =

Thedtsho Gewog ཐེད་ཚོ་
- Gewog
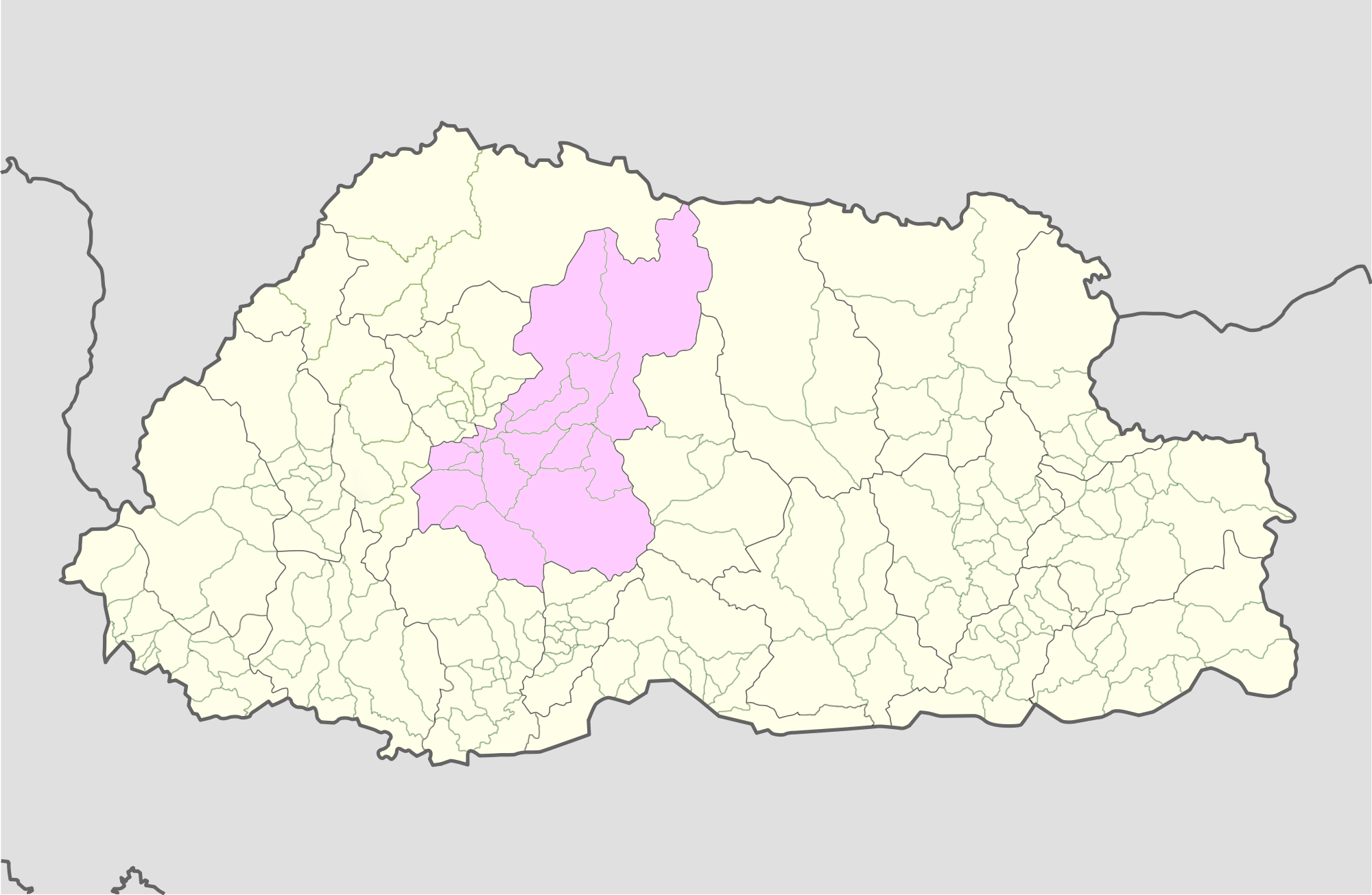
- Country: Bhutan
- District: Wangdue Phodrang District
- Time zone: UTC+6 (BTT)

Thedtsho Gewog (Dzongkha: ཐེད་ཚོ་) is a gewog (village block) of Wangdue Phodrang District, Bhutan. It is one of 15 geowogs in the district.
