= Daga Dzong =

Fortress in Dagana, Bhutan

Coordinates: 27.0709°N 89.8830°E

- Near Dagana in Bhutan

Site information
- Type: Castle, Fortress
- Controlled by: Dagana District Administration
- Website: https://www.dagana.gov.bt

Site history
- Built: 1651
- Built by: · Dronyer Druk Namgyel (under the command of Zhabdrung Ngawang Namgyal

Garrison information
- Past commanders: · Tenpa Thinley (First Daga Penlop)

Daga Dzong (formerly called Daga Trashiyangtse Dzong) is a castle or Dzong (fortress) in the southern part of Bhutan, Dagana District. It is the district's headquarters and also houses the district's Monastic Body.

== History ==
The name Daga Dzong is derived from two sources; Darkala, which comes from the province's guardian deity Jomo Darkala and Darkanang (The Realm of White Prayer Flags) from Dudjom Jigdrol Yeshey Dorji, a great Buddhist master. The dzong was constructed in the year 1651 and is seen as a significant heritage place because of its glorious history. Druk Namgyel was commanded to build the dzong under the order of Zhabdrung Ngawang Namgyel to defend the area from the southern states, present day Assam and West Bengal. Due to the defensive functions of the dzong, the fortress occupies a ridge overlooking the valley.

Daga Dzong is the headquarters for the Dagana district administration and monastic body. Among other sacred relics, the dzong houses a buffalo horn measuring about 4’5”. The horn is believed to have been discovered by Daga Penlop Tempa Thinley in the early 16th century.

However, over the years the dzong withstood several earthquakes and windstorms of which the most severe occurred during the sixth Penlop Pekar Jungney. The entire roof of the dzong was blown away. So, the dzong was renovated and consecrated by the 10th Chief Abbot, Je Tenzin Chogyal.

Ever since Daga Dzong was built in 1651, no major renovation has been carried out until 2012.

== Sources of Name ==
Its name was derived from the two possible sources: Darkarla (the provincial deity) and Darkanang (realm of the White Prayer Flag). Formerly, Daga Dzong was known as Daga Trashiyangtse Dzong.
