= Athang Gewog =

Athang Gewog ཨ་ཐང་
- Gewog
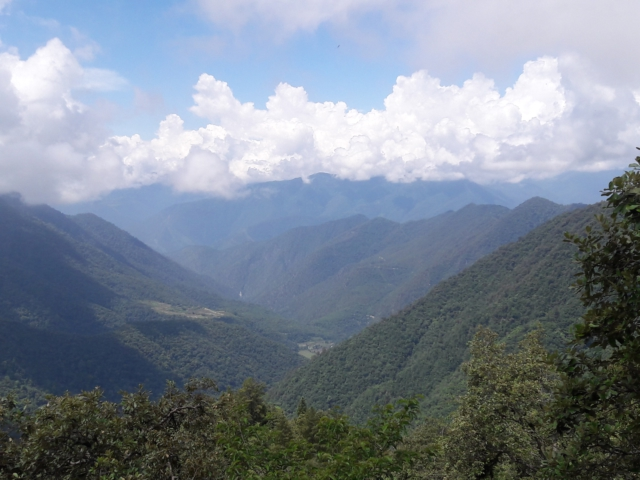
- View of Athang from Dolebchen

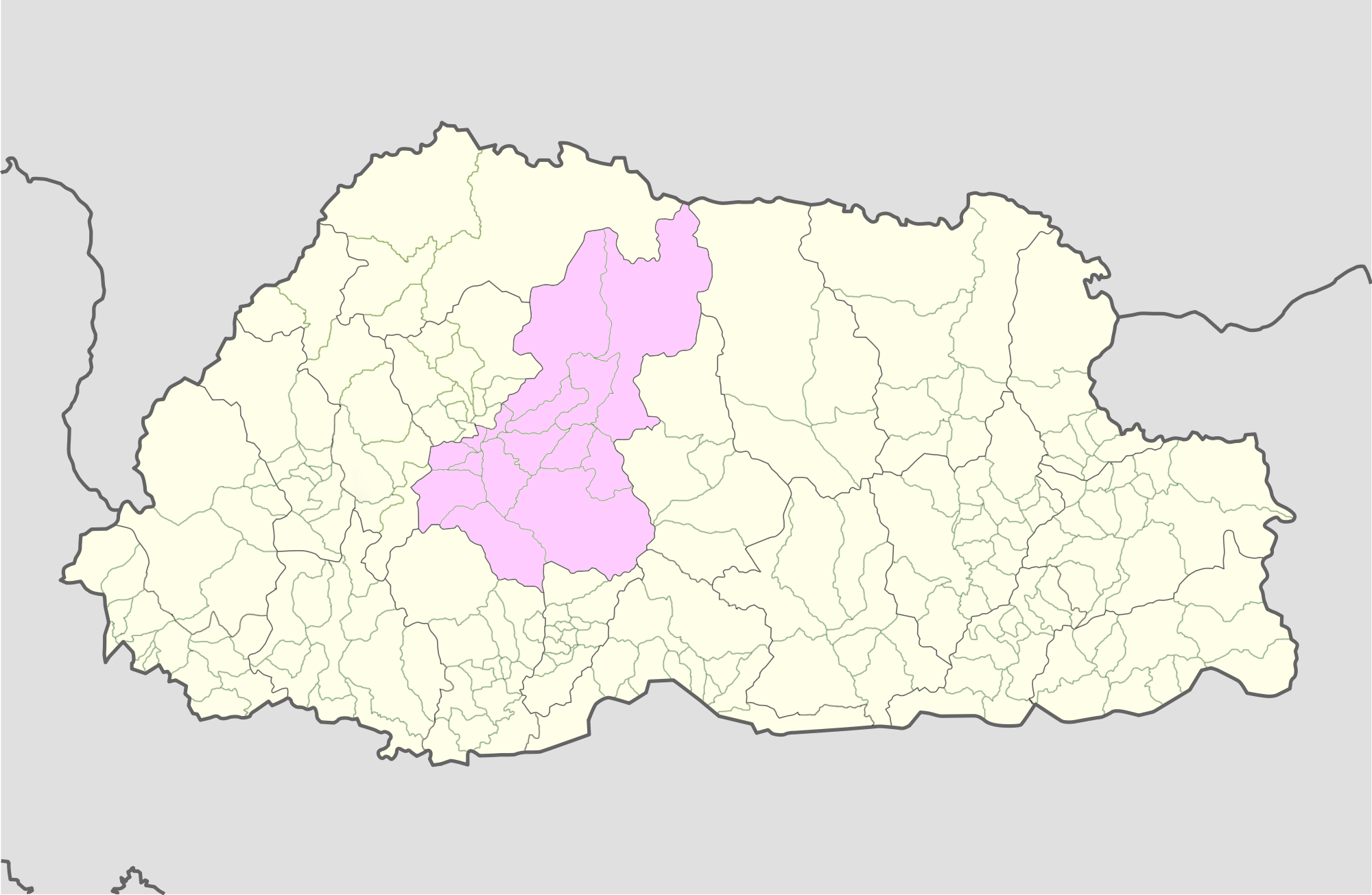
- Country: Bhutan
- District: Wangdue Phodrang District

Government
  - Type: Local Government

Area
  - Total: 746 km^{2} (288 sq mi)
- Time zone: UTC+6 (BTT)

Athang Gewog (Dzongkha: ཨ་ཐང་) is a gewog (village block) of Wangdue Phodrang District, Bhutan.

Athang Gewog is one of the most remotest Gewogs in Wangdue Phodrang District. Two Chiwogs, namely Lopokha-Phaktakha and Lomtshokha makes up the Athang Gewog and Rukha village is composed of two Chiwongs(Lawa Lamga and Rukha). With the settlements widely scattered, the Gewog covers an estimated area of 746 km^{2}.
