= Nyisho Gewog =

Nyisho Gewog ཉི་ཤོག་
- Gewog
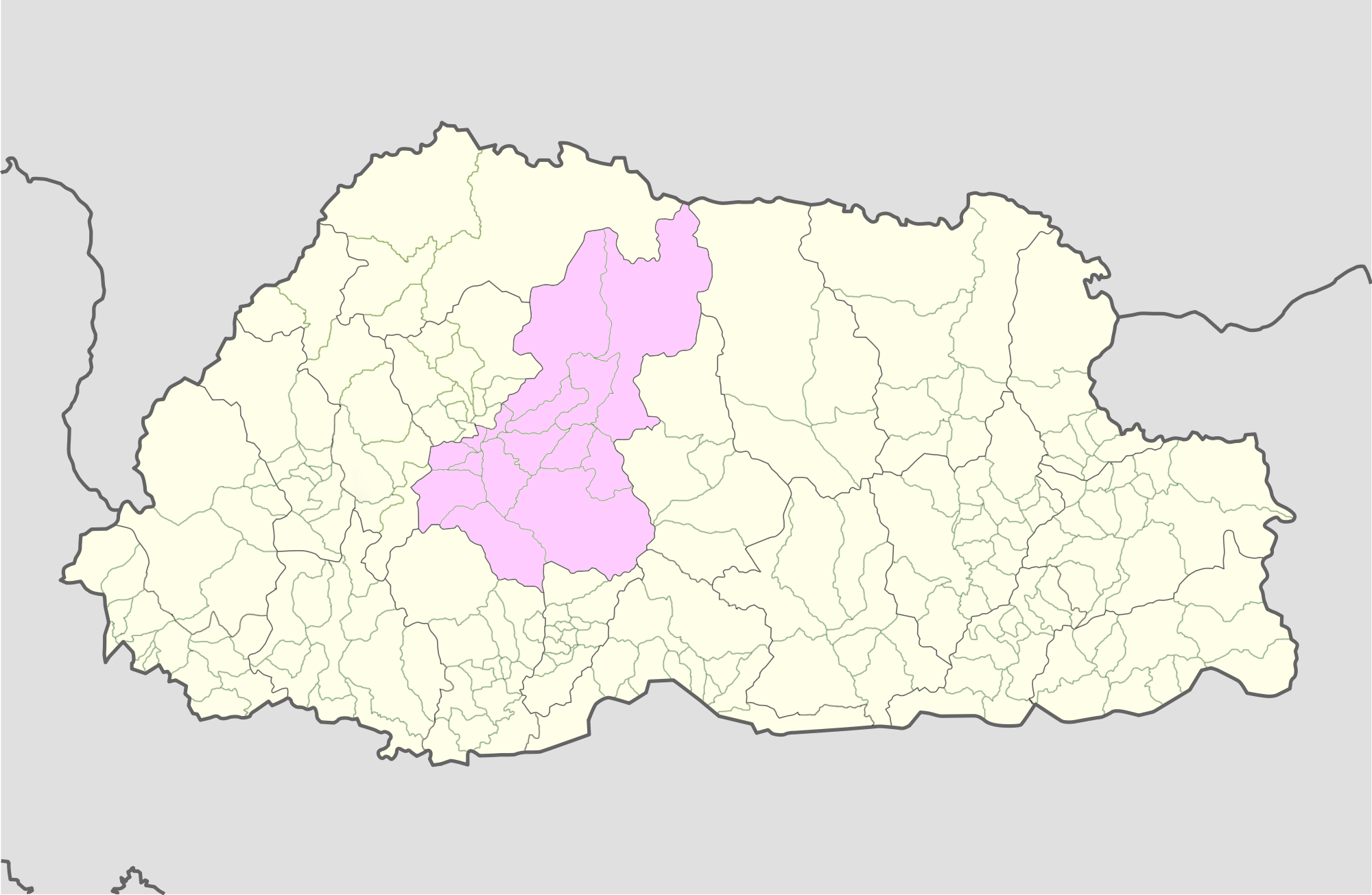
- Country: Bhutan
- District: Wangdue Phodrang District
- Time zone: UTC+6 (BTT)

Nyisho Gewog (Dzongkha: ཉི་ཤོག་) is a gewog (village block) of Wangdue Phodrang District, Bhutan.
