= Dzong architecture =

Type of fortified monastery of Bhutan and Tibet

Dzong architecture is used for dzongs, a distinctive type of fortified monastery (Dzongkha: རྫོང, Wylie: rdzong, [dzoŋ˩˨]) architecture found mainly in Bhutan and Tibet. The architecture is massive in style with towering exterior walls surrounding a complex of courtyards, temples, administrative offices, and monks' accommodation.

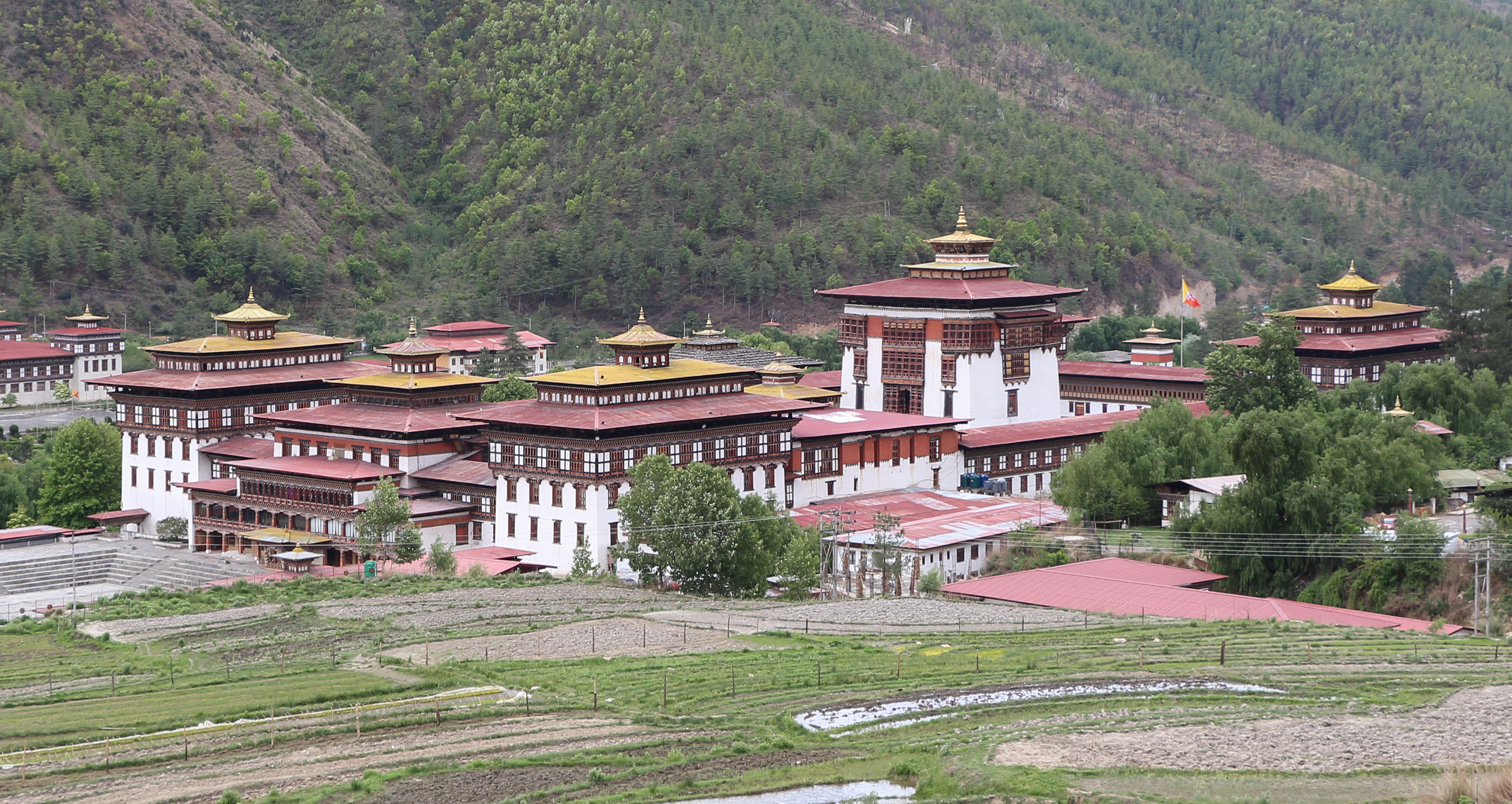
Tashichho Dzong in Thimphu

== Characteristics ==
Distinctive features include:

- High inward sloping walls of brick and stone painted white with few or no windows in the lower sections of the wall
- Use of a surrounding red ochre stripe near the top of the walls, sometimes punctuated by large gold circles
- Use of unique style flared roofs atop interior temples
- Massive entry doors made of wood and iron
- Interior courtyards and temples brightly colored in Buddhist-themed art motifs such as the ashtamangala or swastika

== Regional differences ==
=== Bhutan ===
Dzongs serve as the religious, military, administrative, and social centers of their district. They are often the site of an annual tsechu or religious festival.

Typically half of the rooms inside a dzong serve administrative purposes (such as the office of the penlop or governor), while the other half is dedicated to religious purposes, primarily the temple and housing for monks. This division between administrative and religious functions reflects the idealized duality of power between the religious and administrative branches of government.

=== Tibet ===
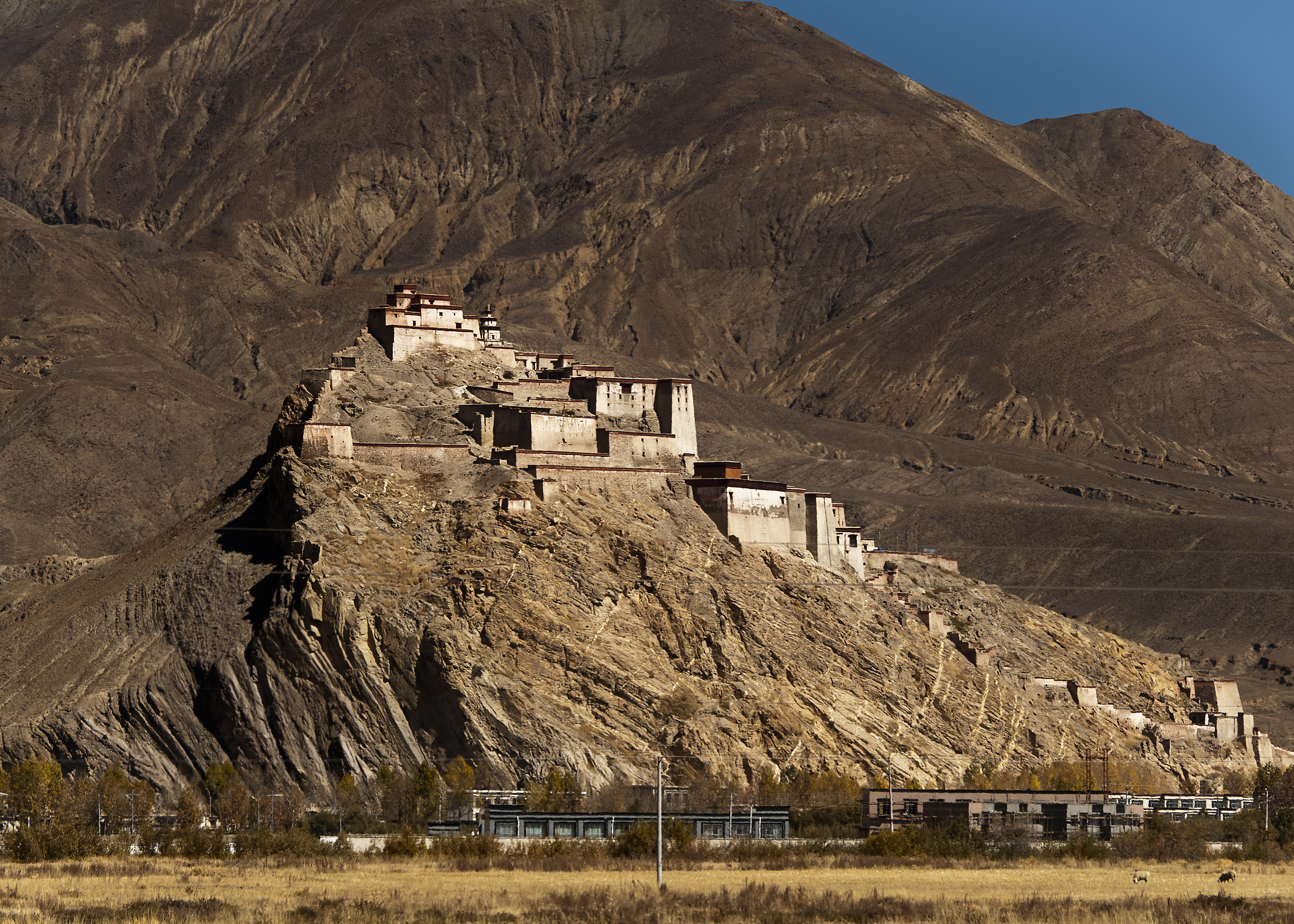
Gyantse Dzong

Tibet used to be divided into 53 prefecture districts also called dzongs. There were two dzongpöns for each dzong, a lama and a layman. They were entrusted with both civil and military powers and are equal in all respects, though subordinate to the generals and the Chinese amban in military matters, until the expulsion of the ambans following the Xinhai Revolution in 1912. Today, 71 counties in the Tibet Autonomous Region are called dzongs in the Tibetic languages.

== Siting of dzongs ==
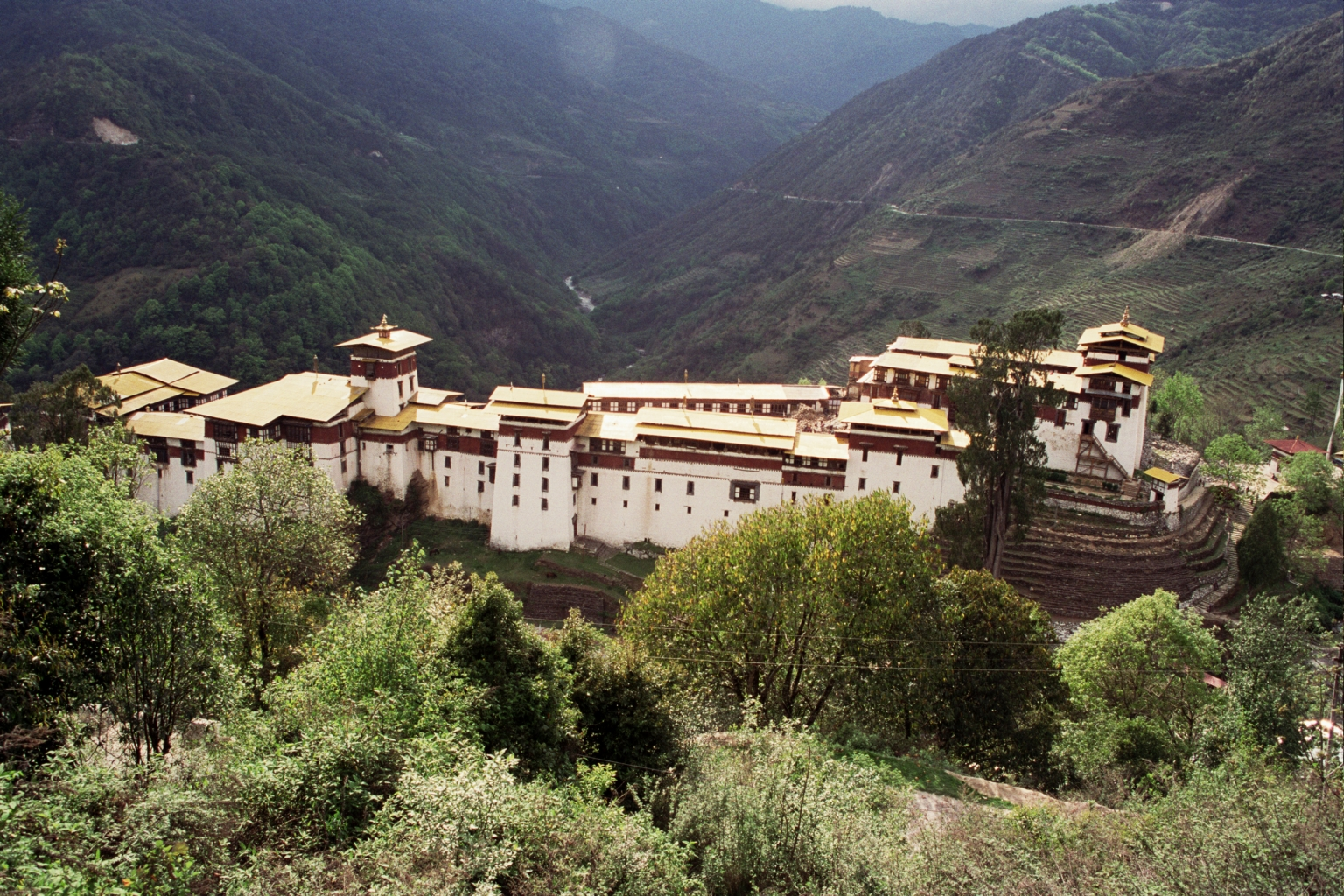
Trongsa Dzong, the largest dzong fortress in Bhutan

Bhutanese dzong architecture reached its zenith in the 17th century under the leadership of Ngawang Namgyal, the 1st Zhabdrung Rinpoche. The Zhabdrung relied on visions and omens to site each of the dzongs. Modern military strategists would observe that the dzongs are well-sited with regard to their function as defensive fortresses. Wangdue Phodrang dzong, for instance, is set upon a spur overlooking the confluence of the Sankosh (Puna Tsang) and Tang Rivers, thus blocking any attacks by southern invaders who attempted to use a river route to bypass the trackless slopes of the middle Himalayas in attacking central Bhutan. Drukgyel Dzong at the head of the Paro valley guards the traditional Tibetan invasion path over the passes of the high Himalayas.

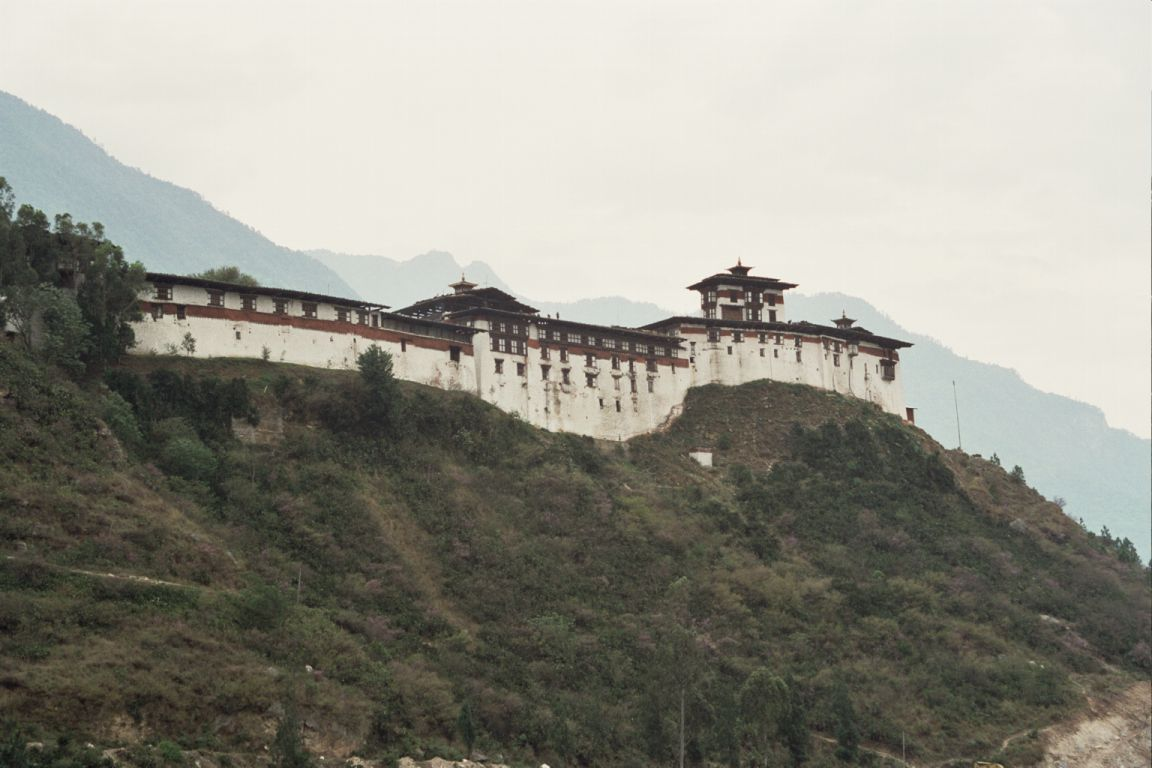
Dzong at Wangdue Phodrang, Bhutan.

Dzongs were frequently built on a hilltop or mountain spur. If the dzong is built on the side of a valley wall, a smaller dzong or watchtower is typically built directly uphill from the main dzong with the purpose of keeping the slope clear of attackers who might otherwise shoot downward into the courtyard of the main dzong below (see image at head of article).

Punakha Dzong is distinctive in that it is sited on a relatively flat spit of land at the confluence of the Mo and Pho Rivers. The rivers surround the dzong on three sides, providing protection from attack. This siting proved inauspicious, however, when in 1994 a glacial lake 90 kilometers upstream burst through its ice dam to cause a massive flood on the Pho Chhu, damaging the dzong and taking 23 lives.

== Construction ==
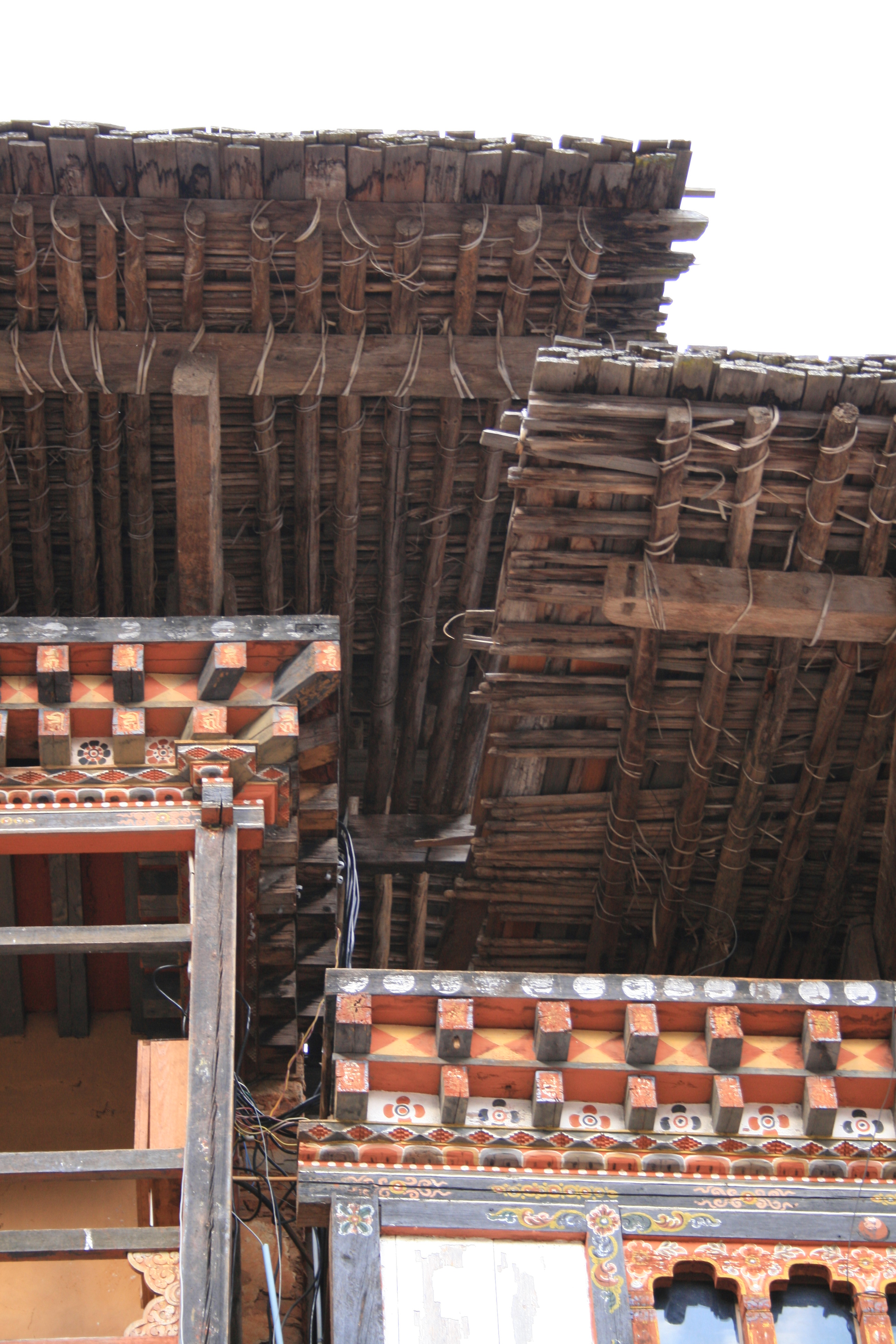
Roof construction at Tongsa dzong

By tradition, dzongs are constructed without the use of architectural plans. Instead construction proceeds under the direction of a high lama who establishes each dimension by means of spiritual inspiration.

Dzongs are built using corvée labor applied as a tax against each household in the district. Under this obligation each family provides or hires a decreed number of workers to work for several months at a time (during quiet periods in the agricultural year) in the construction of the dzong.

Dzongs comprise heavy masonry curtain walls surrounding one or more courtyards. The main functional spaces are usually arranged in two separate areas: the administrative offices; and the religious functions—including temples and monks' accommodation. This accommodation is arranged along the inside of the outer walls and often as a separate stone tower located centrally within the courtyard, housing the main temple, that can be used as an inner defensible citadel. The main internal structures are again built with stone (or as in domestic architecture by rammed clay blocks), and whitewashed inside and out, with a broad red ochre band at the top on the outside. The larger spaces such as the temple have massive internal timber columns and beams to create galleries around an open central full height area. Smaller structures are of elaborately carved and painted timber construction.

The roofs are massively constructed in hardwood and bamboo, highly decorated at the eaves, and are constructed traditionally without the use of nails. They are open at the eaves to provide a ventilated storage area. They were traditionally finished with timber shingles weighted down with stones; but in almost all cases this has now been replaced with corrugated galvanised iron roofing. The roof of Tongsa Dzong, illustrated, is one of the few shingle roofs to survive and was being restored in 2006–07.

The courtyards, usually stone-flagged, are generally at a higher level than the outside and approached by massive staircases and narrow defensible entrances with large wooden doors. All doors have thresholds to discourage the entrance of spirits. Temples are usually set at a level above the courtyard with further staircases up to them.

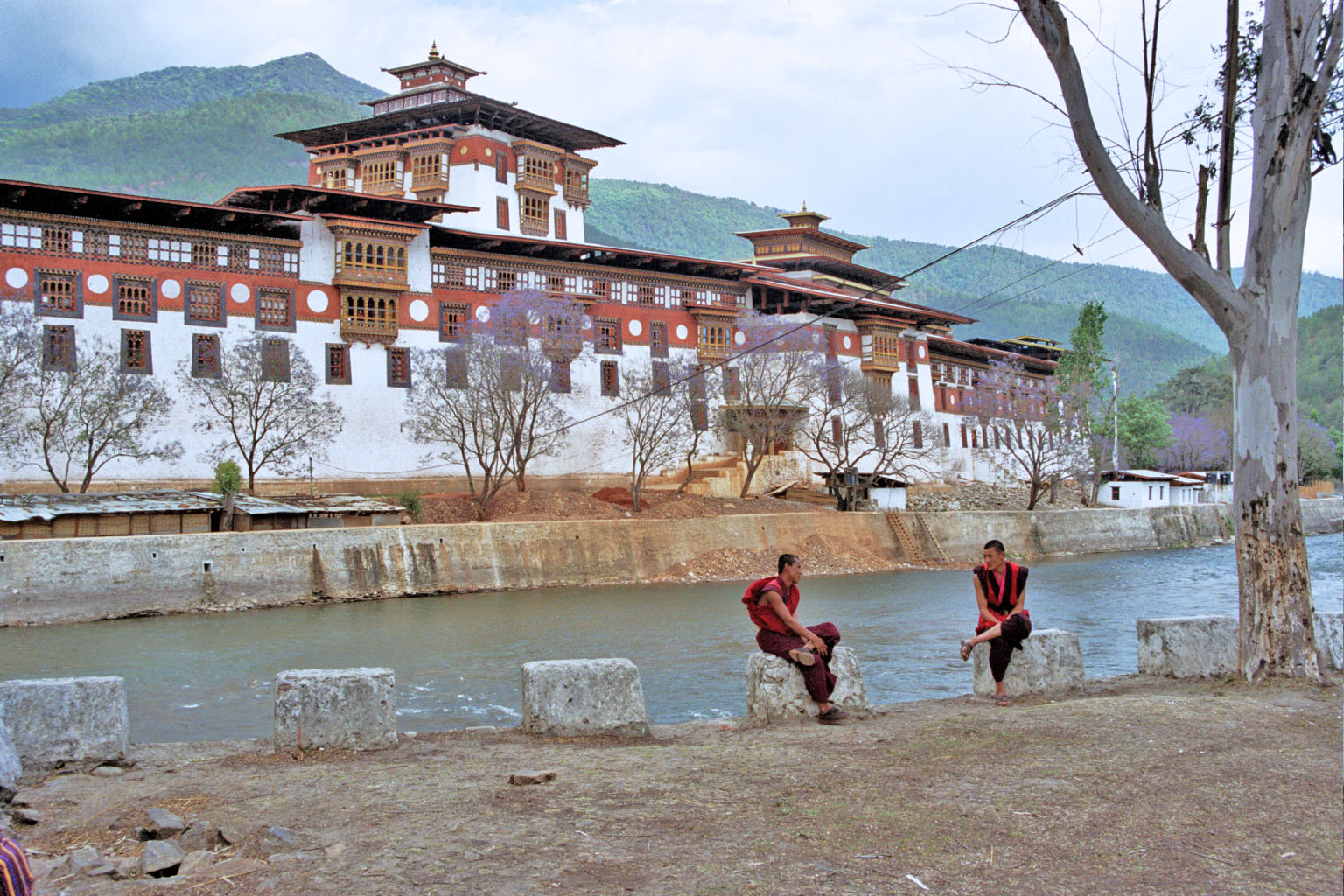
Punakha Dzong and the Mo Chhu

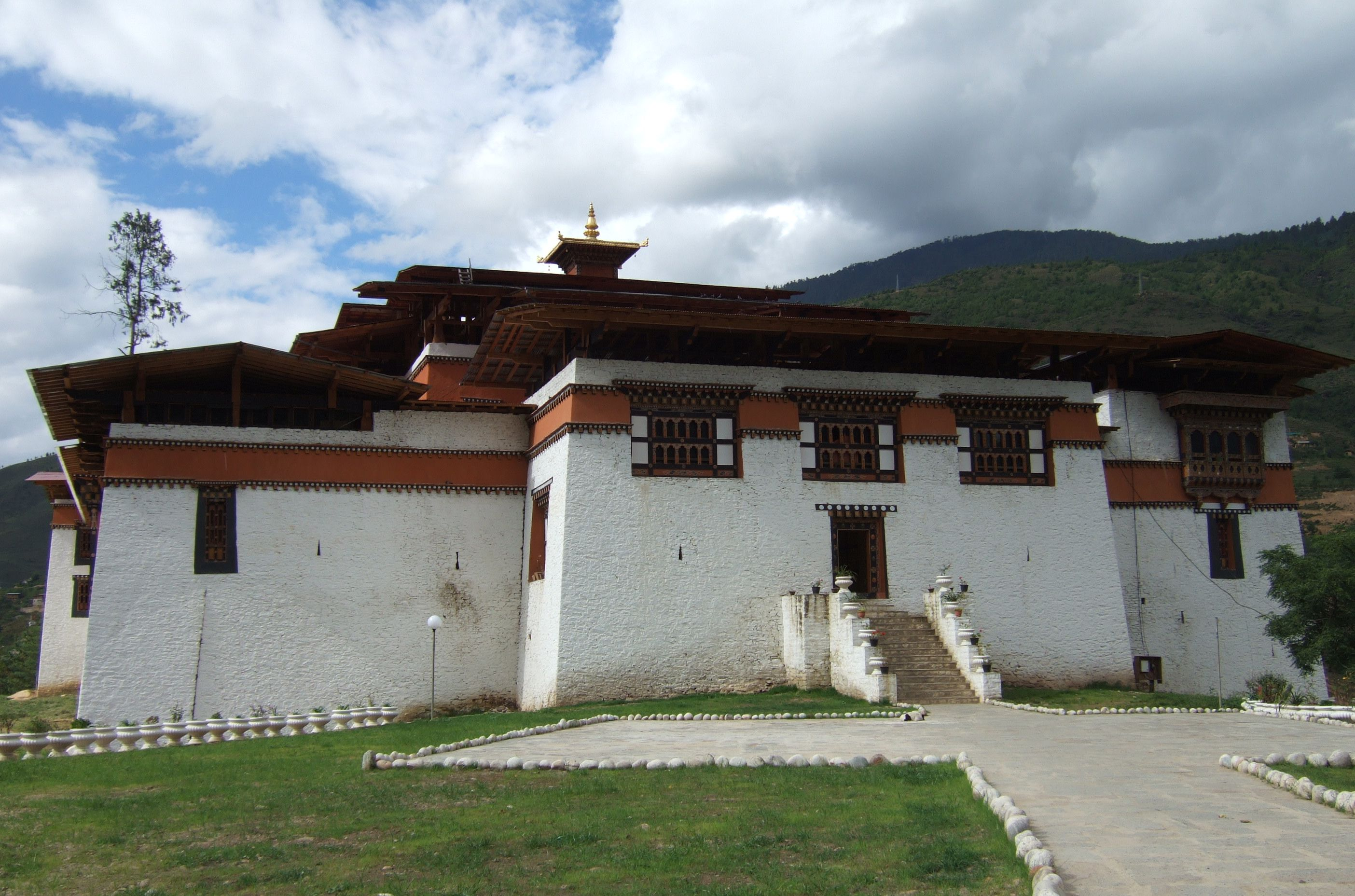
Simtokha Dzong near Thimphu

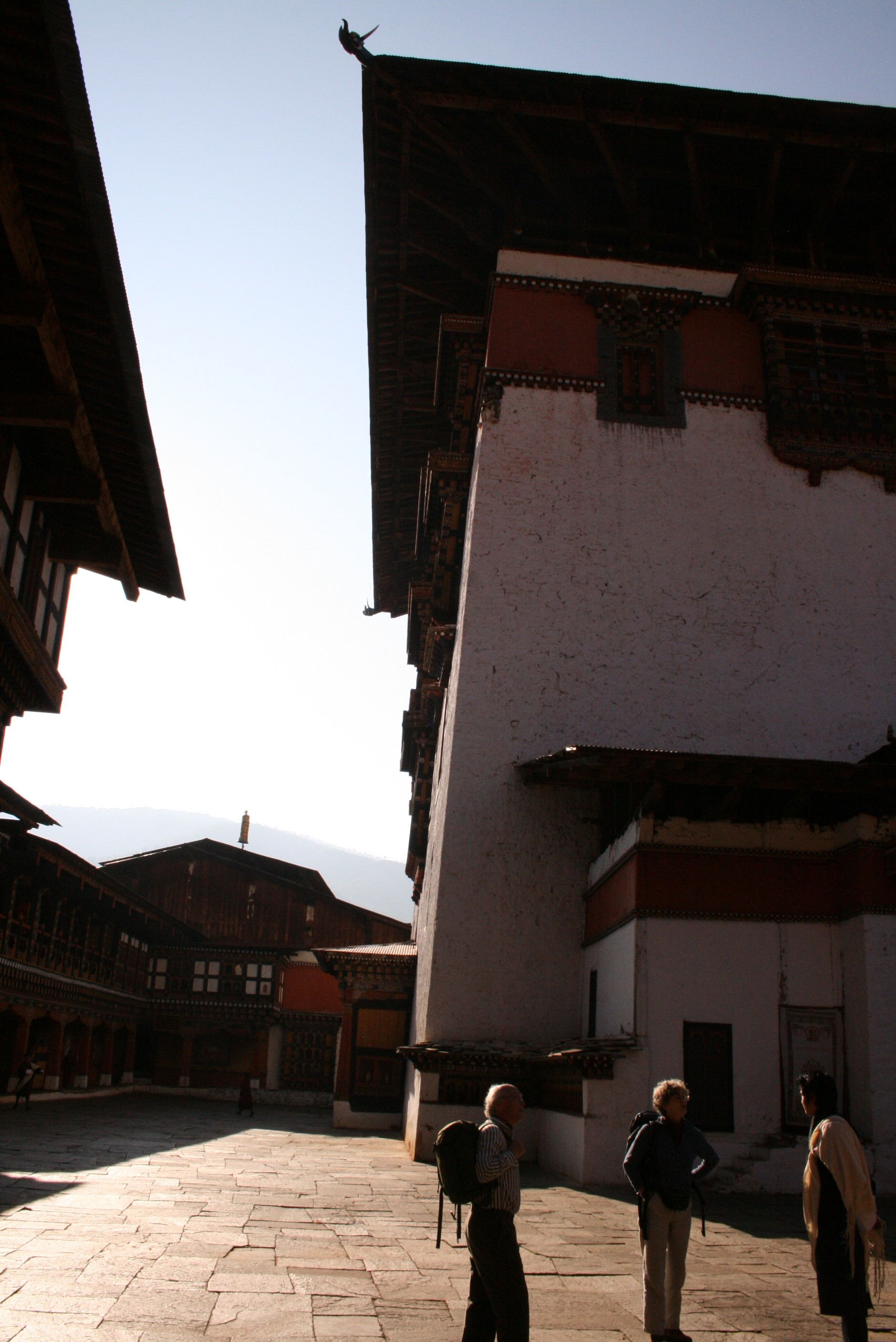
Courtyard and tower of Rinpung Dzong at Paro

== Modern architecture in the dzong style ==
Larger modern buildings in Bhutan often use the form and many of the external characteristics of dzong architecture in their construction, although incorporating modern techniques such as a concrete frame.

=== University of Texas at El Paso ===
The campus architecture of the University of Texas at El Paso (UTEP) is a rare example of dzong style seen outside the Himalayas. Initial phases were designed by El Paso architect Henry Trost, and later phases have continued in the same style.

In the United States, this style became known as Bhutanese Revival and Neo-Bhutanese Revival. The style was first introduced in America in 1917 by El Paso architect Charles Gibson using photographs from an article on Bhutan in the April 1914 issue of the National Geographic Magazine. Upon the suggestion of Kathleen Worrell, the wife of the dean of the State School of Mines and Metallurgy (today's University of Texas at El Paso), Gibson's initial designs appeared on the front page of El Paso newspapers. The governing board of the University of Texas System purchased the designs from Gibson and awarded them to the architectural firm of Trost & Trost. Henry Trost, assisted by the school's faculty, completed the final designs of four Bhutanese Revival buildings at the school's Paso del Norte campus.

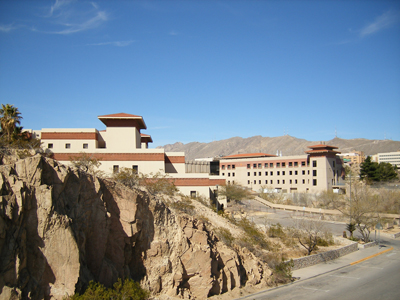
To the left is the College of Business, to the right the College of Engineering

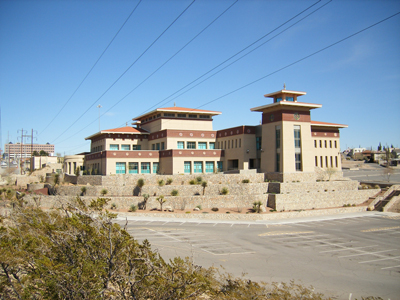
UTEP's Academic Services Building

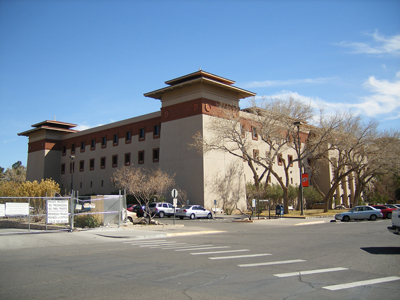
UTEP Library

== UNESCO tentative listing ==
In the year 2012, the Bhutanese government listed five dzongs to its tentative list for UNESCO World Heritage Site inscription in the future, which are Punakha Dzong, Wangdue Phodrang Dzong, Paro Dzong, Trongsa Dzong and Dagana Dzong.

== See also ==
- Architecture in Tibet
- Architecture of Bhutan
- Driglam namzha
