= Wangdue Phodrang District =

District of Bhutan

Coordinates: 27°30′N 90°10′E

Wangdue Phodrang District དབང་འདུས་ཕོ་བྲང་རྫོང་ཁག།
- District
- Location of Wangdue Phodrang district within Bhutan
- Country: Bhutan
- Headquarters: Wangdue Phodrang

Area
  - Total: 4,308 km^{2} (1,663 sq mi)

Population (2017)
  - Total: 42,186
  - Density: 9.792/km^{2} (25.36/sq mi)
- Time zone: UTC+6 (BTT)
- HDI (2019): 0.604 medium · 15th of 20
- Website: www.wangduephodrang.gov.bt

Wangdue Phodrang District (Dzongkha: དབང་འདུས་ཕོ་བྲང་རྫོང་ཁག།; Wylie: Dbang-'dus Pho-brang rdzong-khag; previously spelled "Wangdi Phodrang") is a Thromde and dzongkhag (district) of central Bhutan. This is also the name of the dzong (built in 1638) which dominates the district. The name is said to have been given by the Shabdrung Ngawang Namgyal who was searching for the best location for a dzong to prevent incursions from the south. The word "wangdue" means unification of Country, and "Phodrang" means Palace in Dzongkha.

Wangdue Phodrang is the largest dzongkhag in Bhutan by area and is bordered by Dagana and Tsirang dzongkhags to the south, Trongsa dzongkhag to the east, Thimphu and Punakha dzongkhag to the west, and Gasa dzongkhag and a small section of border with Tibet to the north. It is listed as a tentative site in Bhutan's Tentative List for UNESCO inclusion.

== Wangdue Phodrang Dzong ==
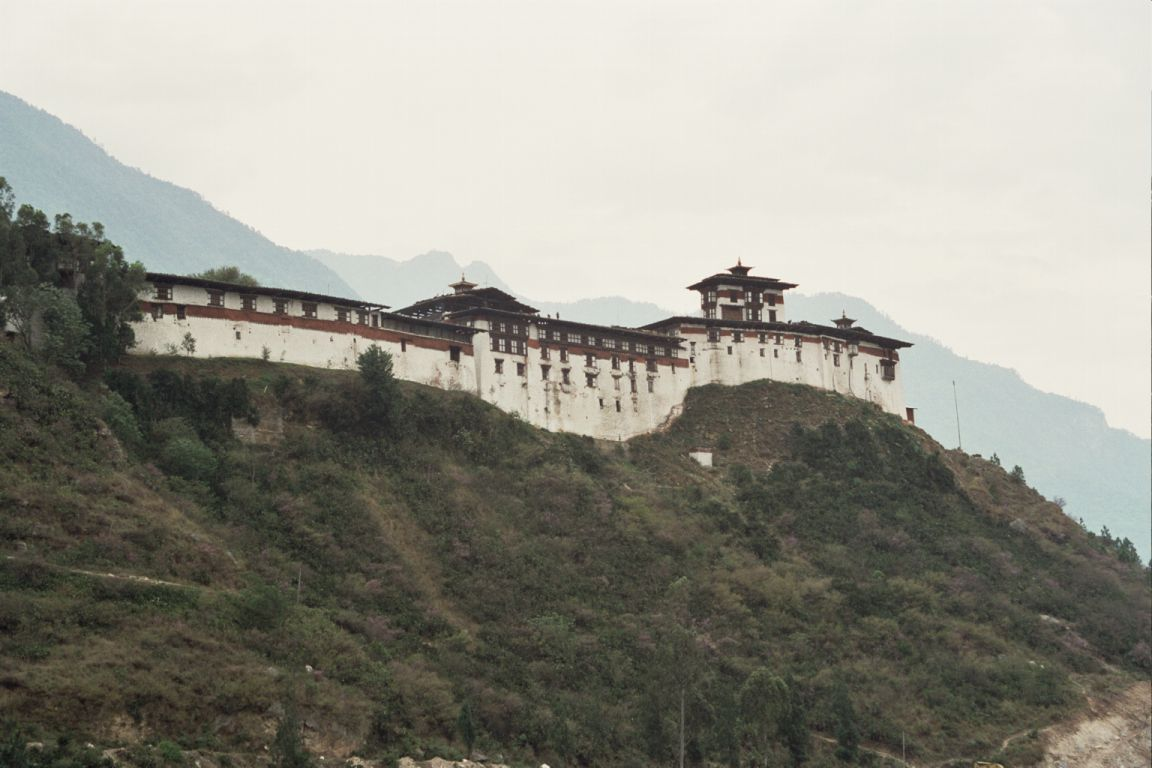
Dzong at Wangdue Phodrang, Bhutan.

An historic dzong built by Shabdrung Ngawang Namgyal in 1638 was located at Wangdue Phodrang. The dzong was burnt down by a fire in June 2012. However, as the dzong was being renovated at the time of the fire, most of the historic relics had been put into storage and so were saved from destruction.

== Languages ==
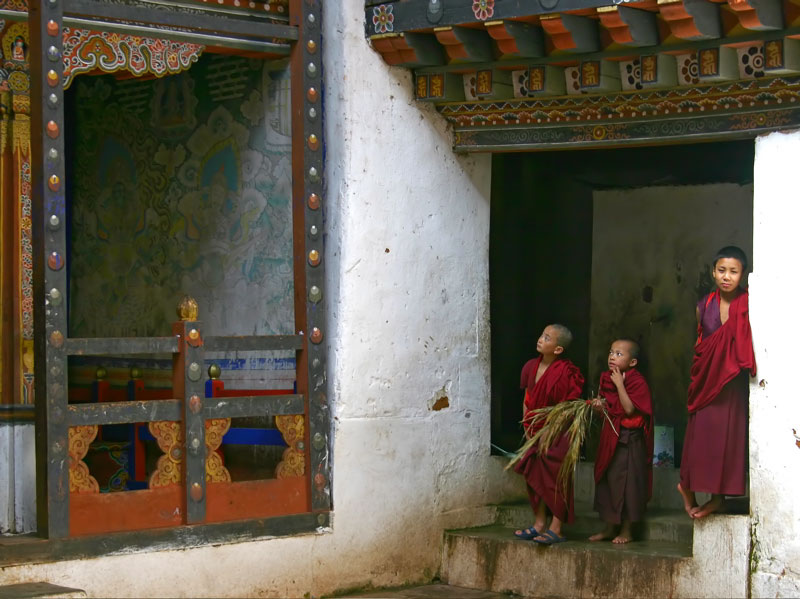
Buddhist novices in Wangdue Phodrang Dzong, Bhutan

The dominant language in Wangdue Phodrang is Dzongkha, the national language, spoken in the western two-thirds of the district. Communities along the border with Bumthang District in the northeast speak Lakha. Along the same border, in central Wangdue Phodrang, inhabitants speak Nyenkha. In southeast Wangdue Phodrang, remnants of the autochthonous 'Olekha (Black Mountain Monpa) speaking community barely survive.

== Transport ==
There are three paved roads in Wangdue Phodrang dzongkhag. The Lateral Road enters from the west at Dochu La Pass, crosses the Sankosh (Puna Tsang Chhu) at Wangdue Phodrang dzong, and continues east to Tongsa. One spur road heads north from Wangdue Phodrang to the dzong at Punakha and slightly beyond. This road eventually becomes the trail to Gasa. A second spur departs the Lateral Road near the Pele La pass halfway between Wangdue and Tongsa, traveling south a short distance to Gangteng Monastery and the Phobjika valley where the rare black-necked cranes (grus nigricollis) may be found.

== Administrative divisions ==
Wangdue Phodrang District is divided into fifteen village blocks (or gewogs):

- Athang Gewog
- Bjena Gewog
- Daga Gewog
- Dangchu Gewog
- Gangte Gewog
- Gasetsho Gom Gewog
- Gasetsho Om Gewog
- Kazhi Gewog
- Nahi Gewog
- Nyisho Gewog
- Phangyuel Gewog
- Phobji Gewog
- Ruepisa Gewog
- Sephu Gewog
- Thedtsho Gewog

== Environment ==
Most of Wangdue Phodrang District is environmentally protected. The northern half of the district (the gewogs of Kazhi, Dangchu and Sephu) falls within Wangchuck Centennial Park, with northwestern pockets (the gewog of Kazhi) belonging to Jigme Dorji National Park. Southeastern Wangdue (the gewogs of Athang and Phobji) is part of Jigme Singye Wangchuck National Park. Also protected are the biological corridors crisscrossing the district that connect Bhutan's extensive national park system.

The environmentally precious and vulnerable lands of Phobjika Valley are not protected by the government, but are maintained by the first and only Bhutanese private conservation group, the Royal Society for the Protection of Nature (RSPN). Chartered as a public benefit nonprofit organization (PBO), the RSPN focuses on education, sustainable agriculture, ecotourism, and improving living standards in ecologically responsible ways.

== Tourist attractions ==
- Phobjikha Valley
- Wangdue Phodrang Dzong
- Adha Tsho
- Gangtey Monastery
- Baeyul Langdra Ney
- Sa Nga Choeling Goenpa, Gangtey
- Chungney Goenpa
- Dechen Draphu
- Dhendrup Choeling Goenzin Dratshang, Dangchu
- Shar Kuenzangling Lhakhang
- Wangdue Goenpa, Busa

== Climate ==
Climate data for Punakha-Wangdue, elevation 1,236 m (4,055 ft), (1990–2017 normals)
Month	Jan	Feb	Mar	Apr	May	Jun	Jul	Aug	Sep	Oct	Nov	Dec	Year
Record high °C (°F)	27.0 (80.6)	30.5 (86.9)	34.0 (93.2)	35.5 (95.9)	36.0 (96.8)	37.0 (98.6)	36.0 (96.8)	35.5 (95.9)	35.0 (95.0)	35.0 (95.0)	32.5 (90.5)	28.0 (82.4)	37.0 (98.6)
Mean daily maximum °C (°F)	18.8 (65.8)	20.7 (69.3)	23.9 (75.0)	26.8 (80.2)	28.8 (83.8)	30.5 (86.9)	30.7 (87.3)	30.4 (86.7)	29.3 (84.7)	27.4 (81.3)	23.9 (75.0)	20.2 (68.4)	26.0 (78.7)
Daily mean °C (°F)	12.3 (54.1)	14.3 (57.7)	17.6 (63.7)	20.6 (69.1)	23.1 (73.6)	25.2 (77.4)	25.8 (78.4)	25.5 (77.9)	24.4 (75.9)	22.0 (71.6)	17.7 (63.9)	13.8 (56.8)	20.2 (68.3)
Mean daily minimum °C (°F)	5.8 (42.4)	7.9 (46.2)	11.2 (52.2)	14.4 (57.9)	17.3 (63.1)	19.9 (67.8)	20.8 (69.4)	20.6 (69.1)	19.4 (66.9)	16.6 (61.9)	11.4 (52.5)	7.3 (45.1)	14.4 (57.9)
Record low °C (°F)	0.0 (32.0)	0.0 (32.0)	2.0 (35.6)	8.0 (46.4)	10.0 (50.0)	12.0 (53.6)	15.0 (59.0)	13.5 (56.3)	12.0 (53.6)	7.0 (44.6)	1.0 (33.8)	1.0 (33.8)	0.0 (32.0)
Average rainfall mm (inches)	13.7 (0.54)	21.7 (0.85)	17.1 (0.67)	43.5 (1.71)	85.4 (3.36)	143.2 (5.64)	157.9 (6.22)	147.9 (5.82)	101.0 (3.98)	46.2 (1.82)	4.7 (0.19)	3.6 (0.14)	785.9 (30.94)
Average relative humidity (%)	75.1	75.9	74.2	73.6	76.4	79.5	81.2	80.9	81.8	78.4	77.0	76.5	77.5
Source: National Center for Hydrology and Meteorology

Climate data for Phobjika, Wangdue Phodrang District, elevation 2,860 m (9,380 ft), (1996–2017 normals)
Month	Jan	Feb	Mar	Apr	May	Jun	Jul	Aug	Sep	Oct	Nov	Dec	Year
Mean daily maximum °C (°F)	9.4 (48.9)	10.8 (51.4)	13.1 (55.6)	15.8 (60.4)	17.6 (63.7)	19.6 (67.3)	20.0 (68.0)	20.3 (68.5)	18.9 (66.0)	16.7 (62.1)	13.2 (55.8)	10.6 (51.1)	15.5 (59.9)
Daily mean °C (°F)	3.0 (37.4)	3.8 (38.8)	6.8 (44.2)	9.3 (48.7)	12.3 (54.1)	14.8 (58.6)	15.7 (60.3)	15.9 (60.6)	14.6 (58.3)	11.2 (52.2)	6.5 (43.7)	3.3 (37.9)	9.8 (49.6)
Mean daily minimum °C (°F)	−3.5 (25.7)	−3.3 (26.1)	0.5 (32.9)	2.8 (37.0)	6.9 (44.4)	10.0 (50.0)	11.3 (52.3)	11.4 (52.5)	10.3 (50.5)	5.6 (42.1)	−0.3 (31.5)	−4.1 (24.6)	4.0 (39.1)
Average rainfall mm (inches)	3.7 (0.15)	11.0 (0.43)	90.0 (3.54)	188.7 (7.43)	273.9 (10.78)	267.7 (10.54)	516.3 (20.33)	530.4 (20.88)	211.3 (8.32)	97.4 (3.83)	36.6 (1.44)	1.2 (0.05)	2,228.2 (87.72)
Average relative humidity (%)	70.0	67.0	69.7	70.7	76.6	80.6	82.6	83.2	81.4	77.3	70.9	65.4	74.6
Source: National Center for Hydrology and Meteorology

Climate data for Samtengang, Wangdue Phodrang District, elevation 1,960 m (6,430 ft), (1996–2017 normals)
Month	Jan	Feb	Mar	Apr	May	Jun	Jul	Aug	Sep	Oct	Nov	Dec	Year
Mean daily maximum °C (°F)	15.4 (59.7)	16.2 (61.2)	19.4 (66.9)	23.7 (74.7)	25.2 (77.4)	26.2 (79.2)	25.9 (78.6)	26.2 (79.2)	25.3 (77.5)	23.9 (75.0)	18.8 (65.8)	17.3 (63.1)	22.0 (71.5)
Daily mean °C (°F)	10.0 (50.0)	10.8 (51.4)	13.7 (56.7)	17.2 (63.0)	19.4 (66.9)	20.7 (69.3)	21.4 (70.5)	21.5 (70.7)	20.5 (68.9)	18.1 (64.6)	13.5 (56.3)	11.7 (53.1)	16.5 (61.8)
Mean daily minimum °C (°F)	4.6 (40.3)	5.4 (41.7)	8.0 (46.4)	10.7 (51.3)	13.6 (56.5)	15.2 (59.4)	16.9 (62.4)	16.7 (62.1)	15.7 (60.3)	12.3 (54.1)	8.1 (46.6)	6.1 (43.0)	11.1 (52.0)
Average rainfall mm (inches)	4.4 (0.17)	13.2 (0.52)	22.6 (0.89)	48.9 (1.93)	88.3 (3.48)	125.4 (4.94)	229.0 (9.02)	204.4 (8.05)	130.9 (5.15)	69.0 (2.72)	9.7 (0.38)	3.0 (0.12)	948.8 (37.37)
Average relative humidity (%)	82.0	81.7	81.3	81.1	82.9	84.9	87.5	87.8	85.8	83.9	82.7	82.8	83.7
Source: National Center for Hydrology and Meteorology

== See also ==
- Districts of Bhutan
- Phobjikha Valley
- Tseshinang
- Wangdue Phodrang Province
