= Black-necked cranes in Bhutan =

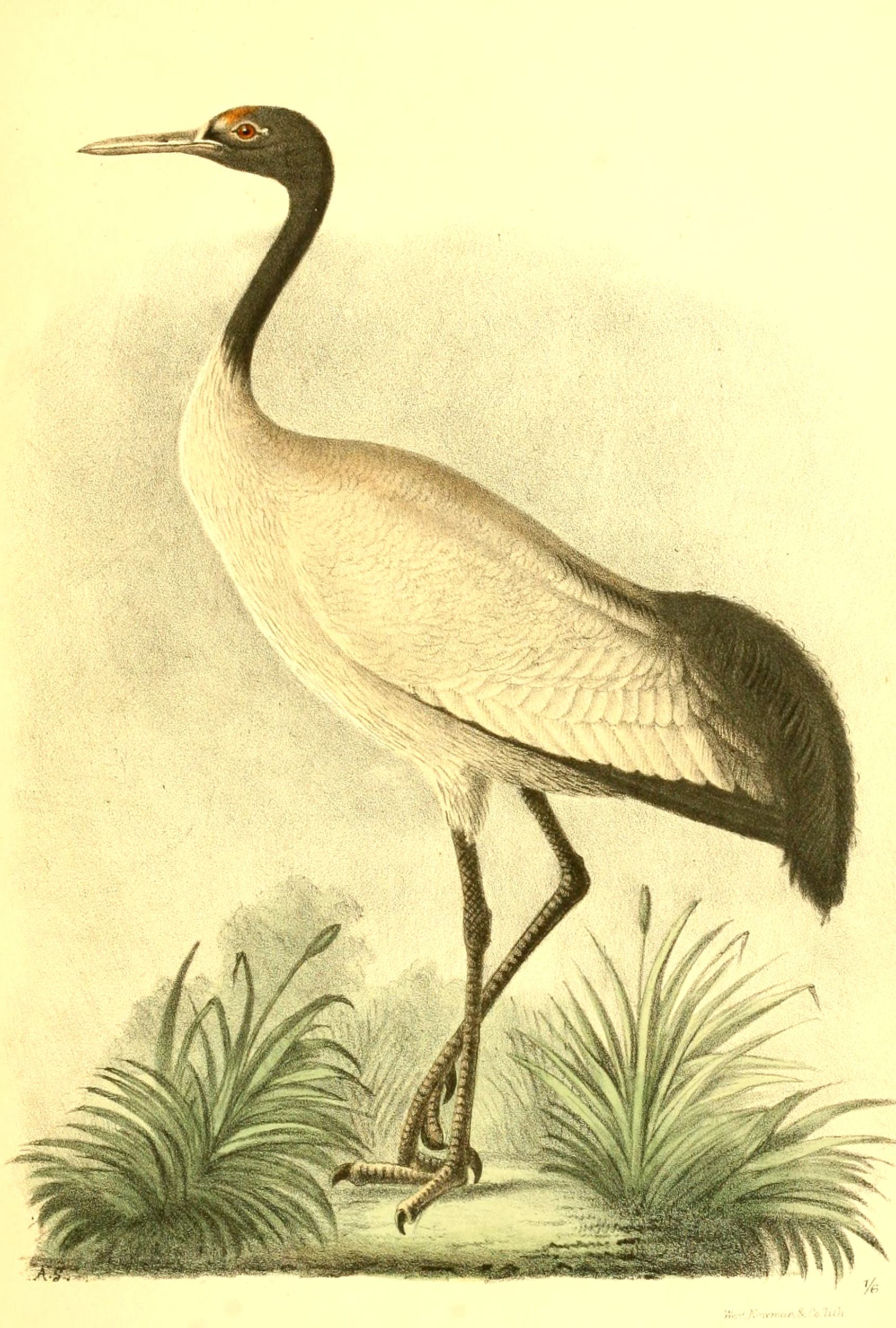
Black-necked crane, Grus nigricollis

Black-necked cranes in Bhutan (Grus nigricollis) are winter visitors during late October to mid February to the Phobjikha Valley as well as Ladakh, India, and Arunachal Pradesh, India. They arrive from the Tibetan Plateau, where they breed in the summer. They visit the Phobjikha Valley in large numbers, which is a declared protected area for the cranes, and also to other valleys in smaller numbers in central and eastern Bhutan.

On arrival in Phobhjikha they are seen to circle Gangteng Monastery three times as if practicing kora ("circumambulation"), and repeat this act as they begin their return to the Tibet Autonomous Region in early spring.

== Sanctuaries ==
The Jigme Dorji National Park adjoining Phobjikha Valley across the Black Mountains has within its precincts the crane wintering area at Bumdeling, which also has been declared a protected area. The black-necked or Tibetan crane is categorized as Vulnerable (Vu) in the IUCN Red List of Threatened Species maintained by the International Union for Conservation of Nature (IUCN) under Appendix I and II of CITES. Black-necked cranes, the last to be found among the 16 known species of cranes, were first identified by Nikolay Przhevalsky of the Imperial Russian Army in 1876 in the Tibetan Plateau.

Apart from China and India, Bhutan has taken special care to protect this species and has established the Phobjikha Conservation Area covering 163 square kilometres (63 mi^{2}) of the valley under the Royal Society for the Protection of Nature (RSPN) and for the purpose of conservation management. The conservation area was established by Bhutan in the Phobjikha Valley in 2003, and RSPN has the mandate to protect not only the black-necked cranes but also 13 other vulnerable species. The cranes, which were hunted in Bhutan until 1980, are now totally protected, with the government enacting a law under which any person killing a crane would invite a long jail sentence.

In Bhutan, black-necked cranes have a celebrity status as witnessed by the Crane Festival held every year on 11 November soon after their arrival from the Tibetan Plateau in the courtyards of Gangten Monastery. Many tourists visit the valley to witness this festival.

== Habitat ==
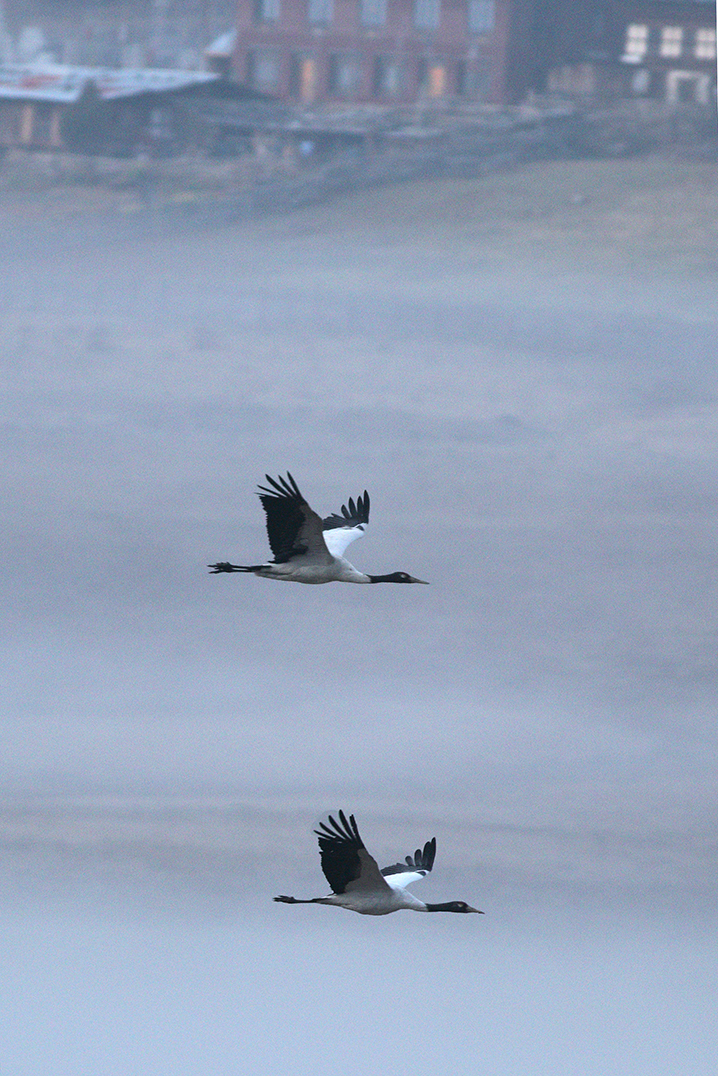
From Phobjikha Valley, Bhutan.

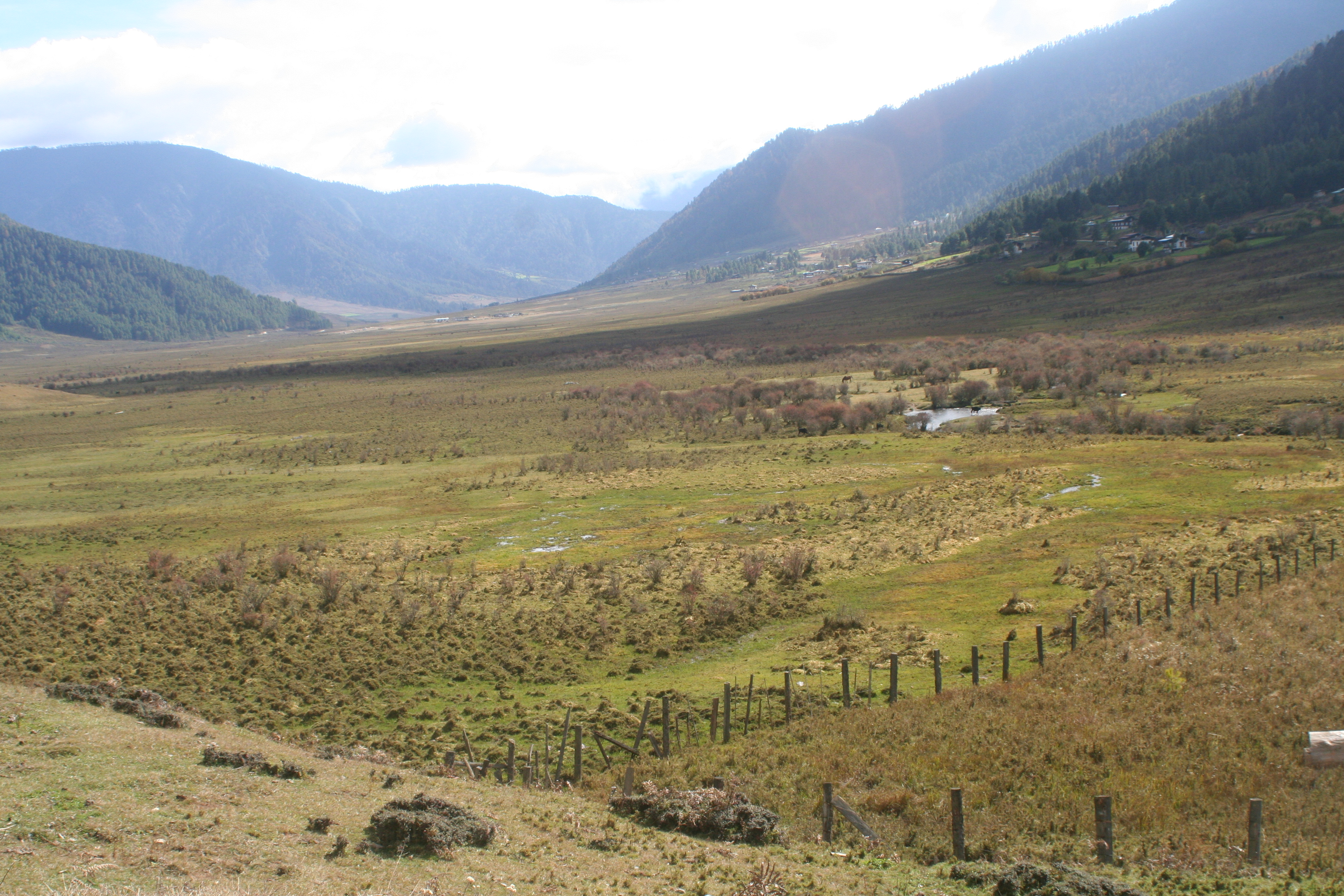
View of Phobjikha

The conservation area or habitat in the Phobhjikha Valley, established in 2003 has, not only the black-necked cranes, but also 13 other vulnerable species such as rufous-necked hornbill Aceros nipalensis, chestnut-breasted partridge Arborophila mandellii, Pallas's fish eagle Haliaeetus leucoryphus, nuthatch Sitta Formosa, wood snipe Gallinago nemoricola, Blyth's tragopan Tragopan blythii, greater spotted eagle Clanga clanga, imperial eagle Aquila heliaca, Baer's pochard Aythya baeri, Hodgson's bushchat Saxicola insignis, dark-rumped swift Apus acuticauda, and grey-crowned prinia Prinia cinereocapilla. The black-necked cranes arrive in this valley in late October and depart in mid February. They feed on the particular type of dwarf bamboos that grow in the wetlands of the valley. The thick grasslands of wetlands are also grazing grounds for a large number of cattle and horses during the summer months that helps the growth of the tender bamboo shoots on which the cranes feed later during the winter season. There were suggestions that the wetlands be drained and used to grow cash crops such as potatoes, which is also the main crop of the valley. Such an action would have deprived the cranes of their main feeding centres. However, Palje "Benjie" Dorji, former Chief Justice of Bhutan, former Minister for Environment and uncle of the present King of Bhutan, as the Chairman of the Royal Bhutan Society and as founder of the Black-necked Conservation Programme prevailed on the Government of Bhutan to drop the proposal to drain the wetlands of the Phobjika Valley to create farms to grow cash rich seed potatoes.

This crane species is legally protected in Bhutan and its hunting is prohibited. The religious culture of the Buddhists has attracted the cranes closer to the religious communities of Lamas, particularly in the Phobjikha and Khotokha valleys. Another reason for this is that when the large number of cranes visit these valleys, which are snow bound, the village community, including the Buddhist Lamas migrate to warmer regions to Wangdue Phodrong, thus avoiding a human conflict with the cranes' habitat, which forage in the valleys in marshy lands that are ploughed before winter and that provide insects and plant material and seeds. In these habitats, it is inferred, that livestock also helps by grazing on grass which in turn helps in bamboo regeneration on which the cranes feed.

Another feature noted in Bhutan is the belief among the common people that they are blessed when cranes circle around their valleys. A particular practice observed is that they plant the winter wheat only after the cranes arrive in their valleys to roost. Bhutanese people sing folk songs as the cranes arrive in Bhutan and also dance in the autumn. They call it as thrung thrung karmo. The religious significance of these cranes is further accentuated in Bhutan by the report that "they mate for life and ...live for 30 or 40 years".

== Population ==
Phobjika valley has recorded the maximum number of cranes in Bhutan for several years. Other places in Bhutan where the cranes have been sighted in small numbers are: Bumdeling, Lhuntshi District, Thangmachu, Thangby-Kharsa, Tashi Yangtse, Punakha Valley, Bumthang Valley, Jakhar Valley, Samtengang, Gyetsa, Khotokha Valley, Gogona and Wangdi. However, the Phobjika Valley is one of the two important wintering grounds, where a special protection centre has been established to protect these birds. The number of cranes reported here was 120 in 1986/87. It rose to 219 in November 2000 and is quoted as 270 now. However, its numbers, reported worldwide, is very large (initially it was mentioned as 800 till they found them in very large numbers in China), with a total world population of about 11,000 individuals (mature individuals about 8,800) in the wild, mostly in China including Tibet, about 500 in Bhutan and small numbers at two valleys in Arunachal Pradesh in India, and a small number in Vietnam also. There are indications that their number is increasing due to conservation efforts which may eventually result in downgrading its vulnerability to threat to a lower category.

== Threats ==
Its habitats in Bhutan, mainly the wetlands, were getting degraded due to agriculture and anthropogenic pressures on its breeding and wintering grounds, causing its numbers to decline, as also in other parts of the world, and was thus declared under the Vulnerable category (C1). The 2006 flood event in Bhutan is said to have affected substantially the crane's roosting habitat in Bumdeling Wildlife Sanctuary. Increasing number of tourists could be a threat in future unless there is proper regulation.

== Conservation measures ==
The conservation measures undertaken in Bhutan to preserve and conserve the cranes are unique; in fact more and more crane habitat areas are being brought under the protected area concept. The Royal Society for Protection of Nature (RSPN) established in 1987, which has the mandate for conservation and nature education has been involved in monitoring the winter visitors to the Phobjika valley and other habitats such as Bomdeling Valley. According to recorded information, 141 cranes visit Bomdeling valley (Phobjika reports a count of about 400 now) every year. RSPN has a Visitor Centre at the Phobjikha Valley, which provides information on cranes and the environment of the valley. The information Centre is a very modern decagonal building, next to a stream, with high-tech equipment. There is an observatory for birdwatchers, a mini theatre with mural painting with narration. The center staff provides services such as narration, facilitation and presentation of the valley and cranes in Bhutan. The Society has also produced a documentary (1989 : On the wings of prayer and 2014: Heavenly Bird with a German TV company) film on the cranes visiting Bhutan every year. Further, in Phubjika the Observation Towers have been so located that they cause the least disturbance to the crane habitats. Tourists are allowed to observe the cranes through the two or three high tech "spotting telescopes'' and spotted on the watch the behaviour of the crane as described in the RSPN pamphlet titled "Field Guide to Crane Behaviour", from a safe distance under the strict supervision of forest officials. Farmers are also advised to replace the barbed wire fencing with wooden and stone fencing to reduce harm to the cranes. Collisions with powerlines cause mortality to many crane species and when electricity was to be provided to the valley, the power cables were laid underground to avoid any mortality. The work was taken up during summer when the birds do not use the area.

Crane population counts are conducted during the winter by the RSPN, the Sherubtse College and the Nature and Trekking Club. A Nature Reserve Centre has also been established at Kibethang, near the Phobjikha wintering grounds with funding provided by WWF and USA. Although Bhutan's wintering cranes are secure to a great extent, the habitat loss such as in Bumthang and Paro due to development and human settlement should be a major conservation issue in future.

== Festival ==
A black-necked crane festival is held every year in the premises of the Gangteng Monastery on 11 November to welcome the cranes, which start arriving in late October. The festival is attended by a large number of local people. On this occasion, children wearing crane costumes perform choreographed crane dances. During this period, cranes are seen flying at high altitudes over the mountains.

== See also ==
- Jigme Singye Wangchuck National Park
- Bumdeling Wildlife Sanctuary
- Black-necked crane
