= Zugne =

Village in Bumthang District, Bhutan

Coordinates: 27°30′29″N 90°44′16″E

Zugne is a village in Bumthang District in central Bhutan, located south of Jakar and east of Gyetsa on the Chume River in the Chume Valley. The village is noted for its weavers with scarves tied to their heads in the Bumthang style. They weave woolen yatras on pedal looms and also make belts. It has two notable workshops along the main road, the Thogmela and the Khampa Gonpo which make brightly colored textiles.

The village has a small temple, Zugne Lhakhang, with a statue of Vairocana and the temple is said to have been established by the great Tibetan Emperor Songtsen Gampo in the 7th century. Additional paintings were added to the temple in 1978 by Lam Pemala, a venerable monk of Zugne.
