= Neyphug Monastery =

Vajrayana Buddhist monastery in Bhutan

Coordinates: 27°23′36″N 89°29′57″E

Religion
- Affiliation: Tibetan Buddhism
- Leadership: Neyphug Tulku (Neytrul)

Location
- Country: Paro Valley, Bhutan
- Interactive map of Neyphug Monastery

Architecture
- Established: 1550
- Elevation: 2,960 m (9,711 ft)

Neyphug Thegchen Tsemo Monastery (Dzongkha: གནས་ཕུག་ཐེག་ཆེན་རྩེ་མོ་དགོན་པ། Wylie: gnas phug theg chen rtse mo dgon pa) is a religious institution in Bhutan in the Nyingma tradition of Tibetan Buddhism. Established in 1550 by the first Neyphug Tulku, the monastery has high significant cultural and heritage value.

== History ==
It was first established and built in 1550. by Yongdzin Ngawang Drakpa also known as the First Neyphug Tulku (Dzongkha: སྤྲུལ་སྐུ་, Wylie: sprul sku, ZYPY: Zhügu, also tülku, trulku). He was a Tertön (Dzongkha: གཏེར་སྟོན་, Wylie: gter ston) or Treasure Revealer, one of the few known Bhutanese among the many Tibetan treasure revealers. The literature and online information are inconsistent regarding the birth and death years of Yongdzin Ngawang Drakpa. However, the authoritative source is considered the Biography of Trulku Ngawang Drakpa which states he was born in 1525 in Kunzangling Bhutan and died in 1599 CE, while others list 1520-1580 CE or simply refer to the 16th century.

Since then, the monastery has had a continuing lineage of reincarnate Tulkus. The current, 9th reincarnation, Neyphug Trulku (Neytrul) whose full name is Ngawang Shedrup Chokyi Nyima was born in Bhutan in 1980 and was recognised and enthroned at the age of nine by Dilgo Khyentse Rinpoche as the reincarnation of Yongdzin Ngawang Drakpa. After a ceremony at Kyichu Monastery in Paro, Dilgo Khyentse Rinpoche inducted Neytrul to his principle monastery Neyphug and instructed him with teachings and empowerments. A summary of the nine Neyphug Tulkus biographies and lineage is currently being published.

After the current Neyphug Tulku returned from his education in India, he established the Neyphug Thegchen Tsemo monastic school at Neyphug Monastery in 2006. It now accommodates 75 student monks between the ages of four and twenty-five years of age. The schools activities are led by Neyphug Tulku and managed by Khempo Tenzin Thinley an accomplished teacher from Gangtey monastery. The schools activities include the annual Tshechu, summer retreats of the monks, Ngöndro retreats of select number of monks, annual Zachoe offerings, and the regular daily activities, classes and teachings.

The original temple structure was partially destroyed by a fire in 1864 and was rebuilt by the Heyphu villagers under the 7th Neyphug Tulku in the traditional rammed earth and timber construction method. This structure survived until a severe earthquake in September 2011 caused major damage particularly across Western Bhutan including the Paro Valley. The temple and monks accommodation at Neyphug monastery were severely damaged. Efforts were made to safe the temple, however it was deemed unsafe and beyond repair. The main temple is currently being rebuilt using locally sourced stone and timber. New monks accommodation and other facilities were reconstructed soon after the earthquake using mudbricks made from locally sourced earth, combined with rammed earth and timber construction and were completed in 2015.

== Geography ==
The monastery sits high above the lower Paro Valley in Western Bhutan, in the administrative district (Dzongkhag) of Paro, in the Shaba/ Shapa village block (Gewog), in the Heyphu/Neyphu village cluster (Chiwog) approximately 7 kilometres above Shaba village at an altitude of 2,960 meters. The temple and monastery structures have clear views across the Paro River valley towards the south-west, and a steep climb towards the north-east to reach the ridgeline and Bemri/Bomri Lakhang at approximately 3,750 meters. Due to the exposure to the moist south-westerly monsoon winds during June to September, Neyphug monastery is surrounded by dense forests of cypress, fir, spruce and juniper. The monastery is connected via an unsealed farm road from Shaba village, winding through numerous farms at first and through progressively denser forests.

There was a forest fire in late April 2024 which threatened Neyphug monastery, however changing wind direction and rainfall helped firefighters to contain the blaze.

== Place naming ==
It was suggested that the original name of Neyphug was Hay Phug, based on the Chökey (classical Tibetan) word 'Hay', meaning an expression of breath-taking surprise. Other sources mention the spelling as Heyphu, Heyphug and Neyphu. Today, the monastery and Tulku are known as Neyphug however, in the local area people also use Heyphu and Heyphug. Neyphu has also been interpreted as meaning "sacred mountain". All of these spellings seem to be used interchangeably in the literature, official government documents and online resources.

Neyphug in Bhutan, should not be confused with the area of Nyephu in the Chushur region of central Tibet, where the Shuksep Kagyu monastery was founded in 1181, approximately 45 kms south of Lhasa

== Establishment of the temple ==
The entire Neyphug mountain area is considered sacred as Padmasambhava (also referred to as Guru Rinpoche, a Buddhist Vajrayana master, known as the second Buddha) is said to have set foot on these lands during the 8th century where Neyphug monastery was established and stands to this day. Padmasmbhava is said to have appeared on the mountain-top during a meditation retreat of the 1st Neyphug Trulku, Ngawang Drakpa. Hereafter Ngawang Drakpa was considered the manifestation of a close disciple of Padmasambhava's

Ngawang Drakpa was given teachings and empowerments by Drung Drung Rinpoche, who appointed Ngawang Drakpa to take care of two monasteries at Bemri (also referred to as Boedmo Rinchen in Ngawang Drakpa’s biography) and Menri. Bemri Gonpa/ Lhakhang are also interchangibly referred to as Bomri, Bömri, Bumri or Bumree. It is located at 3,750 meters altitude and can be reached after a 2.5 hour steep climb from Neyphug Monastery. Bumri means "the hill of one hundred thousand dakinis" due to many rock formations showing footprints and other formations considered sacred. The second and upper structure, located on the mountain peak is the meditation house Drupkhang Gonpa and is considered particularly sacred, as Ngawang Drakpa used to meditate there and experience visions of Padhmansambhava.

The villagers of Neyphu village requested teachings and empowerments from Ngawang Drakpa, and persistently asked him to establish a temple in their village. Eventually Ngwang Drakpa agreed and founded the Neyphug temple at its current location when he was 25 years of age. Based on this reference and Ngawang Drakpa's birth year in 1525, it is assumed that Neyphug temple was founded in 1550.

Associated temples and monasteries of Neyphug lineage Neyphug monastery is the centre-piece of a collection of twelve temples, monasteries and sacred places belonging to the Neyphug lineage. They include Bemri/Bumree, Chortengangkha, JoJo Gonpa, Minchuna Gonpa, Minrekha Phurdok, Phudokha, Phudoe Gonpa, Tsedra Gonpa, Tsendru Gonpa, Yangche Gonpa and Zayngo Lhakhang.

Zayngo Lhakang, is located on the Paro-Thimphu highway, not far from Paro airport, and was until recently a ruin with a special history. It was originally a farmhouse belonging to Zhabdrung Rinpoche the founder of the Bhutanese state. It was offered to the fourth Neyphug Trulku Rinpoche, Sangdag Nueden Dorji, for his services in dispelling the Tibetan invasion in the 17th Century. The 10th Desi (political leader of Bhutan) in recognition of the 4th reincarnate Neyphug Rinpoche services offered him the farmhouse, then called Zhelgno Zhhichim, along with seven acres (2.8 hectares) of periphery land. The farmhouse became the residence of the 4th Neyphug Rinpoche.

The building had fallen into ruin and was restored in 2017 using traditional architectural engineering knowledge and craftsmanship and old timbers and woodworks from the Neyphug temple damaged in the 2011 earthquake. It was the current Neyphug Tulku's wish to restore and convert the ruin into a café and ongoing enterprise to help fund the monastery’s ongoing activities and monastic school.

== Cultural value and heritage ==
The monastery has highly significant cultural and heritage value due to the many renowned clay sculpture artisans who lived and worked there. The Neyphug artisans are still to this date known for their magnificent clay sculptures. Neyphug and its environs have been the residence of a series of gifted sculptors and artisans, beginning with the master Tsang Khenchen (1610- 1684 CE), who was invited to Bhutan from Tibet in the 1630s. A painter, Tsang Khenchen established his seat near Neyphug at Menchunang (also known as Minchuna Gompa) and began accepting students, transmitting to them what would become the basis of Bhutanese style art: a reliance on rich colours, lush and intricate botanical motifs and portrait-like depictions of religious masters.

The importance of Tsang Khenchen extends well beyond the arts, as he founded the first shedra, or Buddhist monastic college, near Neyphug monastery. With this act, he provided the basis for Buddhist monastic education in the region and constituted the model that would be followed by all of Bhutan. One of Tsang Khenchen’s students was the reincarnation of Neyphug’s founder, Yongdzin Ngawang Dragpa. This reincarnated master, Sangay Gyalthsen (1600-1661) marked the continuation of Neyphug’s incarnation lineage of respected religious authorities, many of whom were renowned artisans as well.

It was the third reincarnation of the Neyphug lineage, Thuchen Ngawang Padma Gyaltshen who established a center for clay-sculpture at Neyphug monastery. To this date, the Neyphug tradition of clay-sculpture is recognised as the tradition continues to be taught at the monastery today.

Within its walls, the 2-storey Neyphug temple displayed sculptures from the last five centuries and its wall paintings further revealed the most important deities of Buddhist tradition. There are also some artefacts held in sacred shrines at Neyphug monastery that date back to the 8th century and are said to have belonged to Padmasambhava himself. These will be reinstated once the new temple structure is completed and consecrated.
