= Khotokha Valley =

Valley in Bhutan

- Floor elevation: 2,600 m (8,500 ft)

Naming
- Native name: ཁོ་ཐང་ཁ། (Dzongkha)

Geography
- Population centers: Khotokha
- Coordinates: 27°26′8.16″N 89°59′49.01″E
- Interactive map of Khotokha Valley

Ramsar Wetland
- Official name: Khotokha
- Designated: 7 May 2012
- Reference no.: 2033

Khotokha Valley (ཁོ་ཐང་ཁ in Dzongkha) is a valley in Wangdue Phodrang District in central Bhutan. The valley floor consist of a wide wetland which is often used by the Black-necked Cranes(ཁྲུང་ཁྲུང་སྐེ་ནག) in winter. The valley was designated as a Ramsar site in 2012.
