= Gangteng Monastery =

Buddhist monastery in Bhutan

Gangteng Monastery Gangteng Gönpa Gangteng Sangngak Chöling
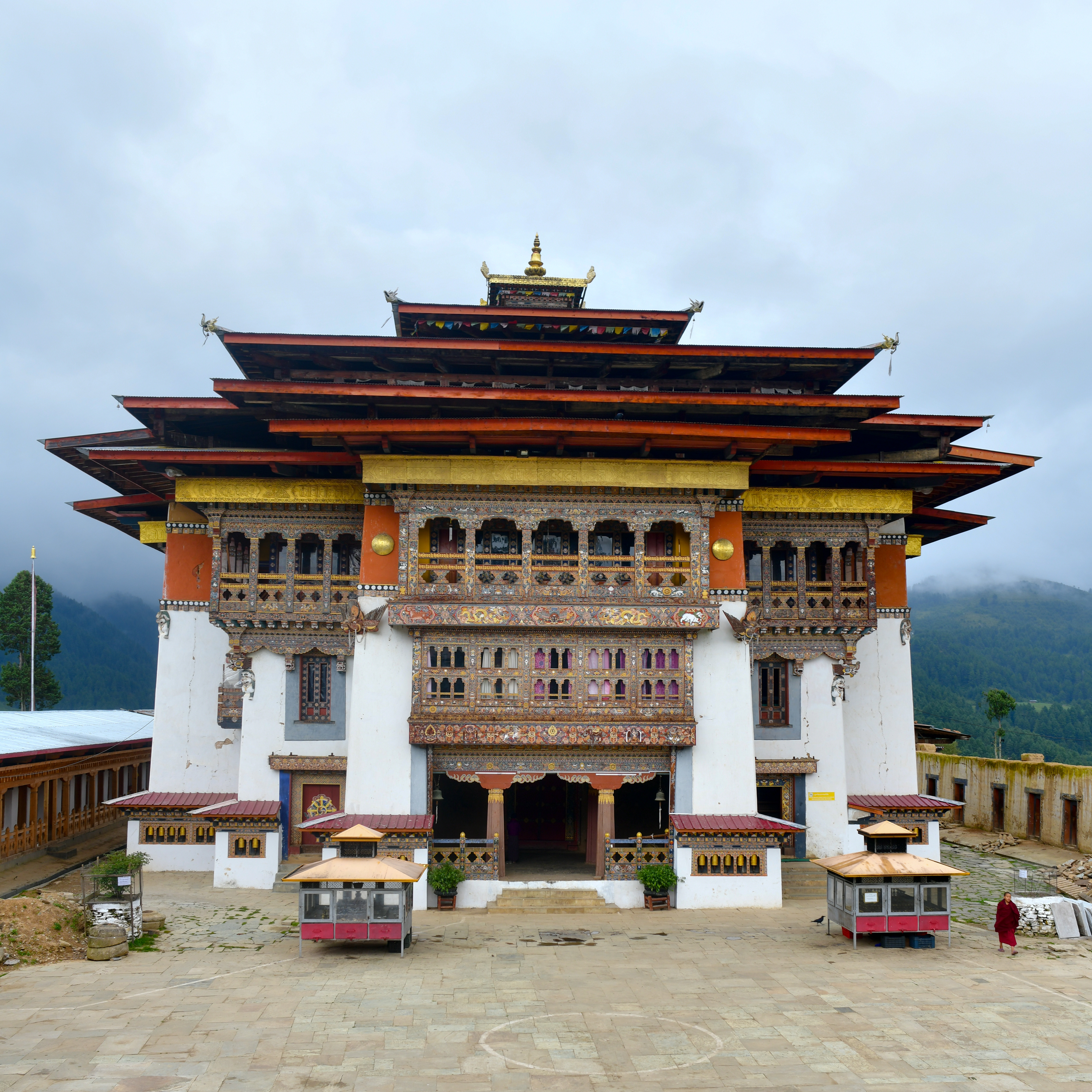
- Gangteng Monastery

- Location within Bhutan

Religion
- Affiliation: Tibetan Buddhism
- Festivals: Tshechu and Crane Festivals
- Leadership: Rigdzin Kunzang Pema Namgyal

Location
- Location: Wangdue Phodrang District, Bhutan
- Coordinates: 27°30′N 90°10′E

Architecture
- Style: Bhutanese Architecture
- Founder: Gyalsé Pema Thinley
- Established: In 1613 by Gyalsé Rinpoche; Gangteng Tulku; Rigdzin Pema Tinley (1564–1642)

Gangteng Monastery (Dzongkha: སྒང་སྟེང་དགོན་པ ), also known as Gangtey Gonpa or Gangtey Monastery, is a monastery of Nyingmapa school of Tibetan Buddhism, the main seat of the Pema Lingpa tradition, located in the Wangdue Phodrang District in central Bhutan. The monastery, also known by the Gangtey village that surrounds it, is in the Phobjikha Valley where the black-necked cranes visit in winters to roost. The black-necked cranes circle the monastery three times on arrival and repeat when returning to Tibet. The monastery's history traces to the early 17th century and back to the prophecies made by the terton (treasure finder) Pema Lingpa in the late 15th century.

The monastery is one of the main seats of the religious tradition based on Pema Lingpa's revelations and one of the two main centres of the Nyingmapa school of Buddhism in the country.

A Nyingma monastic college or shedra, Do-ngag Tösam Rabgayling, has been established above the village.

The descent of the first king of Bhutan, Gongsar Ugyen Wangchuck of the Wangchuck Dynasty of Bhutan, which continues to rule Bhutan, is traced to the clan of the Dungkhar Choje, a subsidiary of the clan of Khouchung Choje whose founder was Kunga Wangpo, the fourth son of Pema Lingpa.

== Geography ==
The Gangteng Monastery, also spelt Gantey Gonpa, bounded on the west side by the Black Mountains (Bhutan) (range above 5,000 metres (16,000 ft) elevation), is located on a spur amidst the Gantey village, overlooking the vast U-shaped glacial Phobjikha Valley, which is at an elevation of about 3,000 metres (9,800 ft) and which has marshy land. The Nake Chuu river runs through this valley. The monastery commands striking views of the Phobjika Valley below. The Black Mountain Region is inhabited by nomadic shepherds and yak-herders.

Wangdue Phodrang, the district headquarters, is 45 kilometres (28 mi) from the Nobding village in the Phobjikha Valley on the Trongsa road from where a short diversion road leads to the Gonpa. It is 75 kilometres (47 mi) to Thimphu, the capital of Bhutan. The Gonpa lies on the popular trekking route of the 'Gangtey trail' which starts from the bottom of the Phobjikha valley, passes through the Gangteng Valley, then climbs up to the Gangteng Gonpa, then goes through the Kumbu village on the east of the Gangteng Gonpa, passes through Gedachen, Khebaythang, the Kilkhorthang villages and finally touches the Kungathang Lhakhang.

== History ==
The Gangteng Monastery, also called the Gangteng Sangngak Chöling སྒང་སྟེང་གསང་སྔགས་ཆོས་གླིང་, was established in 1613 by the first Peling Gyalsé Rinpoche or Gangteng Tulku, Rigdzin Pema Tinley (1564–1642), who was the grandson of the great Bhutanese "treasure revealer" Terchen Pema Lingpa (1450–1521). The earliest historical background relevant to this monastery is traced to establishment of the Vajrayana tradition of Buddhism, by Guru Rinpoche, who was instrumental in making Bhutan a Buddhist nation. The Guru, during his visits to the country in the 8th and 9th centuries, had hidden many sacred treasures called terma (images and scriptures), to avoid their desecration or destruction during troubled times, at various places in Bhutan to be retrieved in later years by treasure finders, to propagate the teachings of Buddha. These were retrieved at various periods over time and in the 15th century Pema Lingpa, born in 1450, considered an incarnation of Guru Rinpoche, prompted by a revelation of 108 treasure coves in his psychic dream revealed by his Guru Rinpoche. He embarked on the treasure hunt in 1476 when he was 25 years of age. He was successful in locating many treasures of images and scriptures related to Buddhism throughout Bhutan, which resulted in establishing many monasteries throughout Bhutan, and Buddhism took firm roots in the country. Consequently, Pema Lingpa came to be known as the "King Terton", a revered saint and teacher. The Terton came on a visit to the Phobjikha Valley as a saint to teach Buddhist precepts to the people and also to bless them. During this visit, after looking at the impressive mountains that surrounded the valley he had foretold that one of his descendants would build a monastery or gonpa on the Gangtey (meaning top of the mountain) and make it famous as the seat of the Peling tradition. This prediction came true when a monastery was built by his grandson Gyalse Pema Thinley in 1613, and the spur of the mountain was given the name, the Gangteng Sang Nga Choling (meaning: "summit for the teaching of the dharma"). He became the first Trulku (spiritual head of the monastery or gonpa) of the monastery. It was initially built as a Lhakhang, a small village monastery, which was later expanded by his son Tenzing Legpai Dhendup (1645–1726), who succeeded him as the second Trulku. It was built like a Dzong (fortress).

From 2002 to 2008, the monastery has been completely restored under the present Gangteng Tulku, H.E. Rigdzin Kunzang Pema Namgyal (b. 1955). The rebuilt monastery was consecrated by the present incarnation of Pema Lingpa on October 10, 2008, graced by the fourth King of Bhutan. Gangteng Sang-ngak Chöling, as now restored, retains its original glory and is stated to be the resurgence of the Peling Tradition.

In the context of the 1864–65 battle fought between the British Army and the Bhutanese Army at Deothang in Bhutan, it is mentioned that the severed hands of a British military officer have been "preserved in the sanctum sanctorum of the Gangteng Gonpa."

== Structure ==
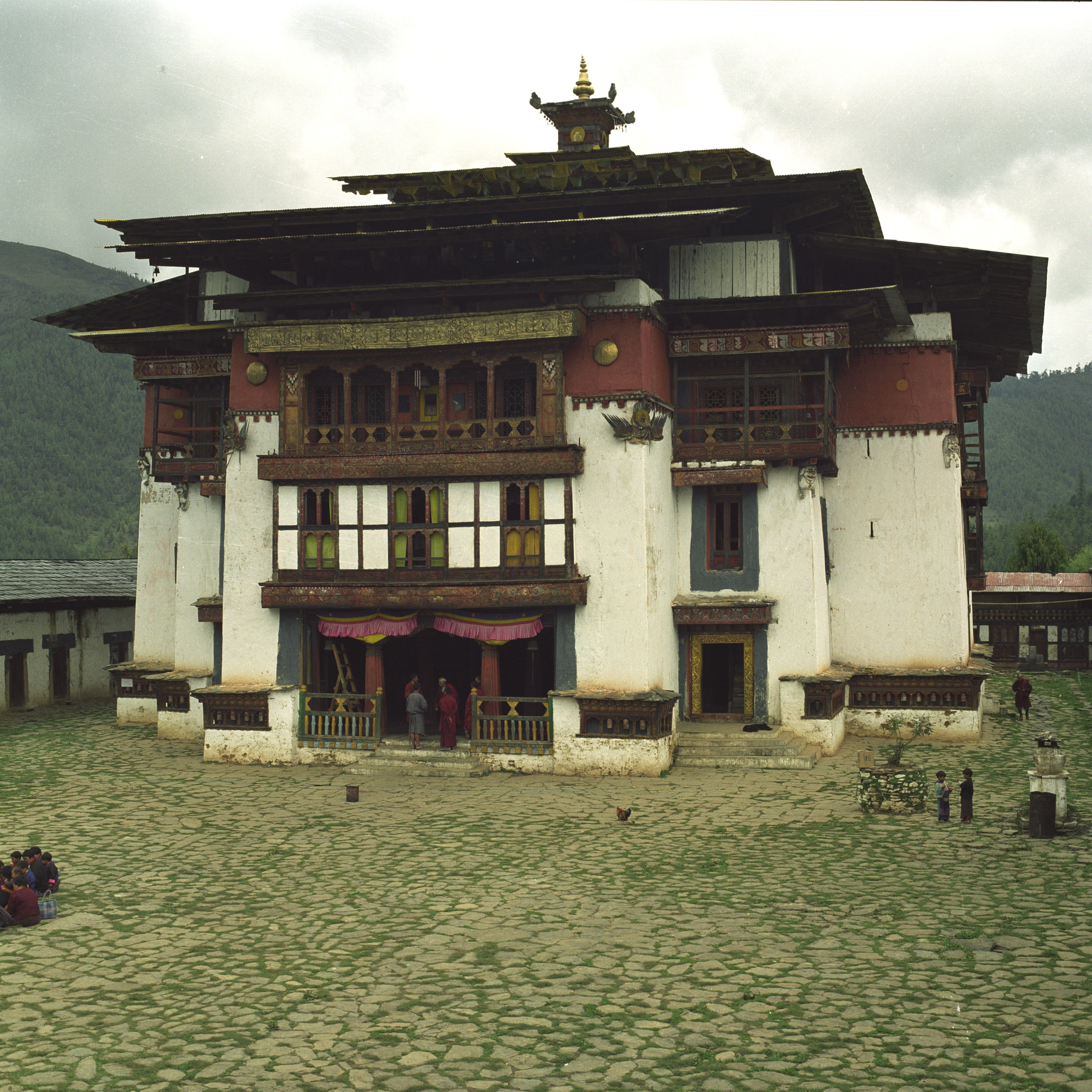
Gangteng Monastery in 2001 before renovation

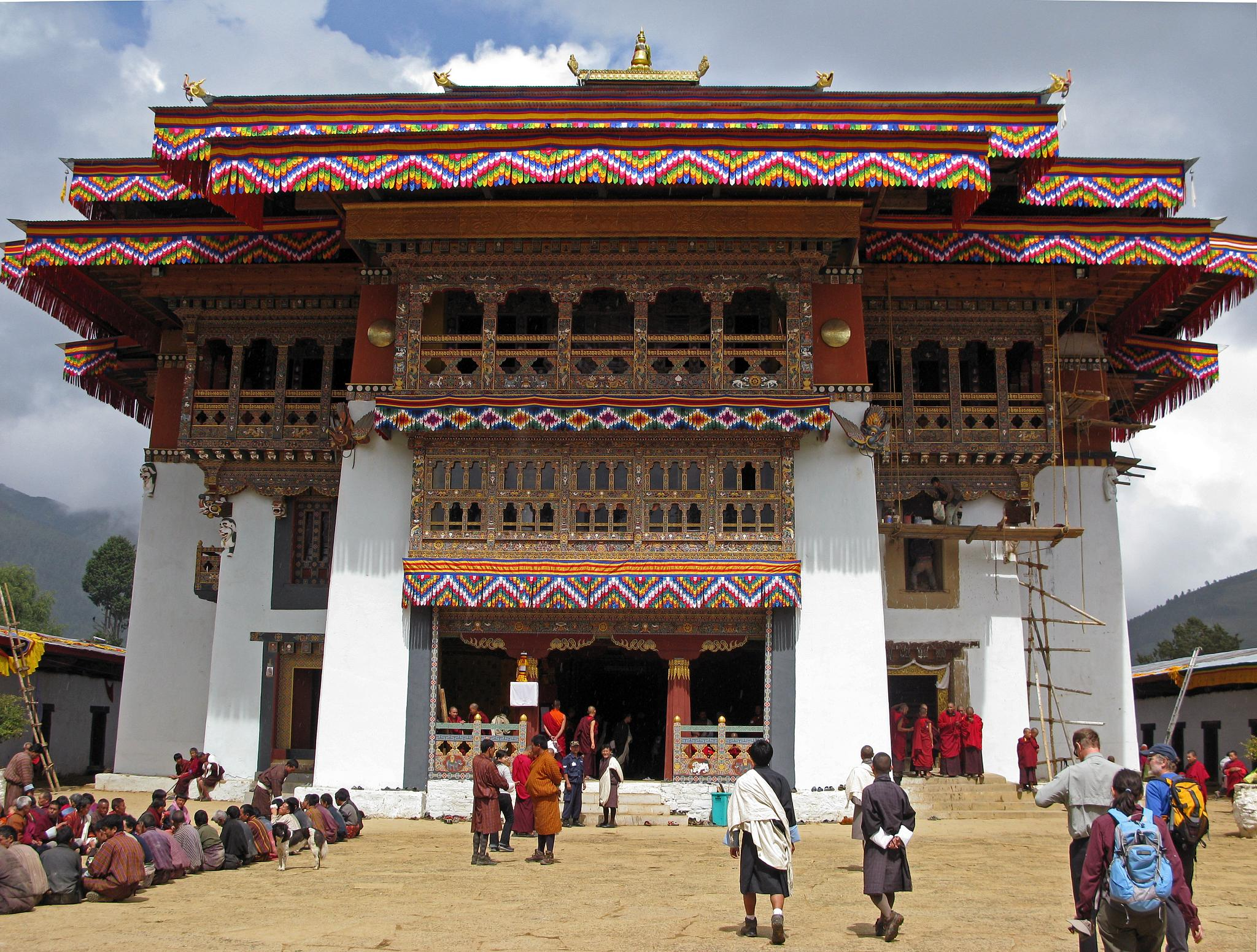
Gangteng Monastery after renovation in 2008

The construction of the original Lakhang was done with full community effort. The local materials such as timber came from the nearby forest trees that were cut, shaped and used for construction of the pillars, beams and windows. Building stones were extracted from the local hills; in this context a legend is also stated that the local guardian deity, called the Delep, facilitated availability of stones by creating a landslide in the opposite hill. A renowned artisan of the Umze of Lhalung Monastery in Tibet was specially brought from Tibet to head as the zowpon to guide the team of local craftsmen. Voluntary labour force was organized from among the devotees of the local village of Gangten.

The monastery underwent a major refurbishing from 2000, which lasted for eight years. It was a massive restoration work which was organized by the ninth Gangteng Trulku, Kunzang Rigzin Pema Namgyal (stated to be the reincarnation of the body of Pema Lingpa) at a project cost of Bhutanese ngultrum (Nu) 700 million "to preserve this remarkable legacy for the future." He engaged 'Landmarks Foundation' to mobilise the restoration and preservation of the Gonpa. This was the first occasion for the Landmarks Foundation to engage in a project in which the sacred site was fully functional. The structural problems were first identified, particularly as the wooden parts which deteriorated and affected the structure. The refurbishing was planned in such a way as not to disturb "the original aura and grandeur of the monastery". The Royal Government of Bhutan supervised the work and provided the necessary technical and architectural support, including raw materials. This building construction lasted for eight years and all efforts were made to preserve the old structures, carvings, and paintings to the extent possible, while 104 new pillars were intricately crafted by the local artisans. This task was also supported by the fourth King of Bhutan with technical support and guidance. The monastery was painted with durable special mineral paints, locally called the dotshoen. The monastery occupies a prime space in the Phobjika valley, and as built now it is a large complex consisting of the central Gonpa, surrounded by monks' living quarters, meditation halls and a guest house. It also houses a school.

The monastery complex has five temples that surround the main central tower. The main hall in the monastery called the tshokhang has been built in Tibetan architectural style. The hall is built with eight very large wooden pillars, which are stated to be the largest in Bhutan. Wood work, both inside and outside of the old structure, which had deteriorated have been replaced. Similarly, some of the paintings and frescoes inside the monastery have also been redone. The monastery is now maintained by 100 odd lay monks (locally known as the gomchen). The monks are also assisted by Buddhist devotees whose families reside in the village near the Gonpa.

The restoration work has been done by craftsmen supported by gomchens, who are lay monks (not necessarily celibate). These monks supported themselves and offered their services free. The carpenters carved 50 feet (15 m) long wooden beams with lovely motifs out of blue-pine, by hand with set of wood-handled tools. Some used daggers to carve dorje (a diamond thunderbolt motif) which is a recurring theme in the exteriors of the monastery. The ancient gateway leading to the monastery was redone (see infobox).

Elaboration of the layout

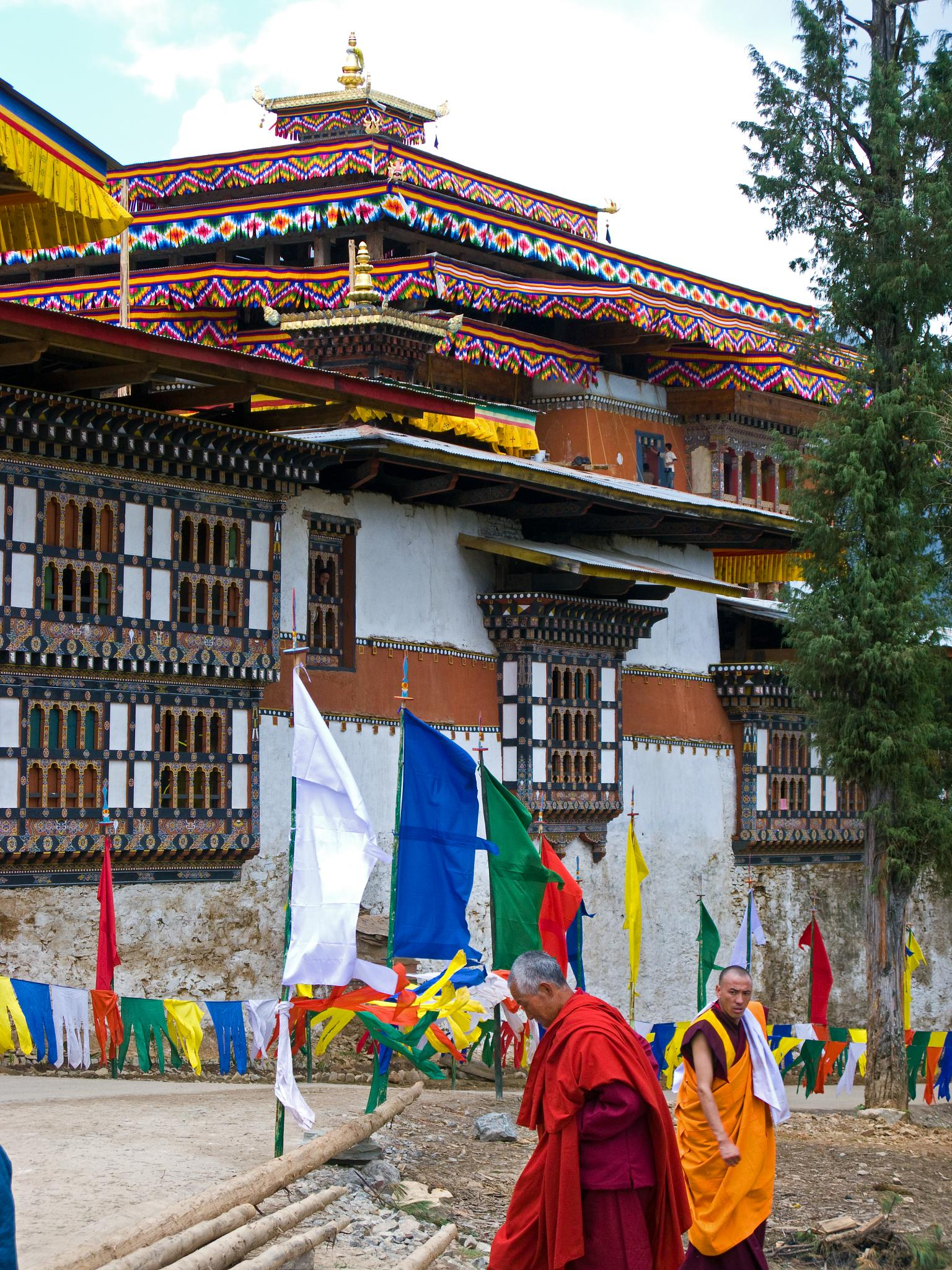
Monks outside the Gangteng Monastery during consecration in 2008

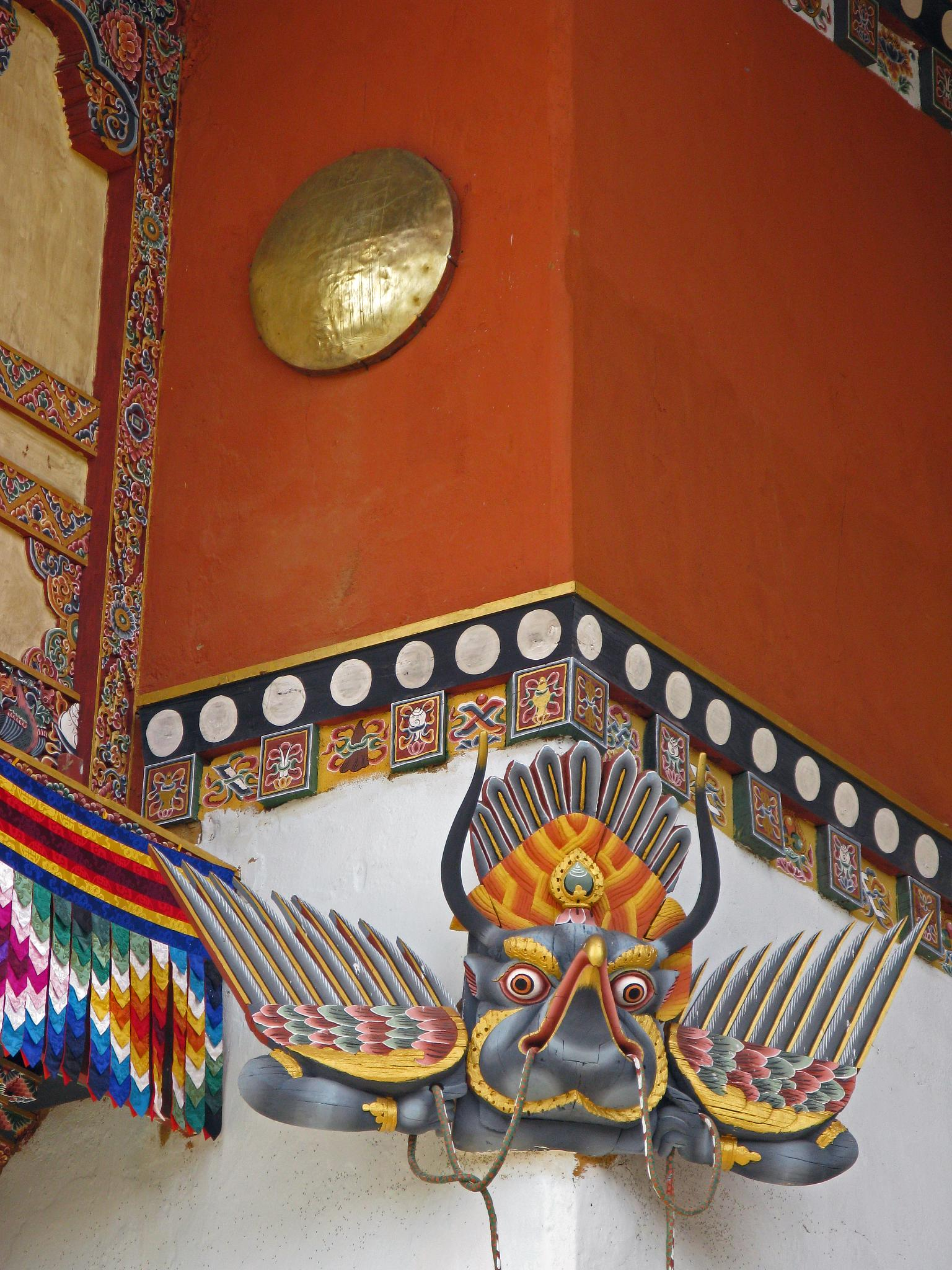
An architectural feature of Garuda in the refurbished Gangteng Monastery

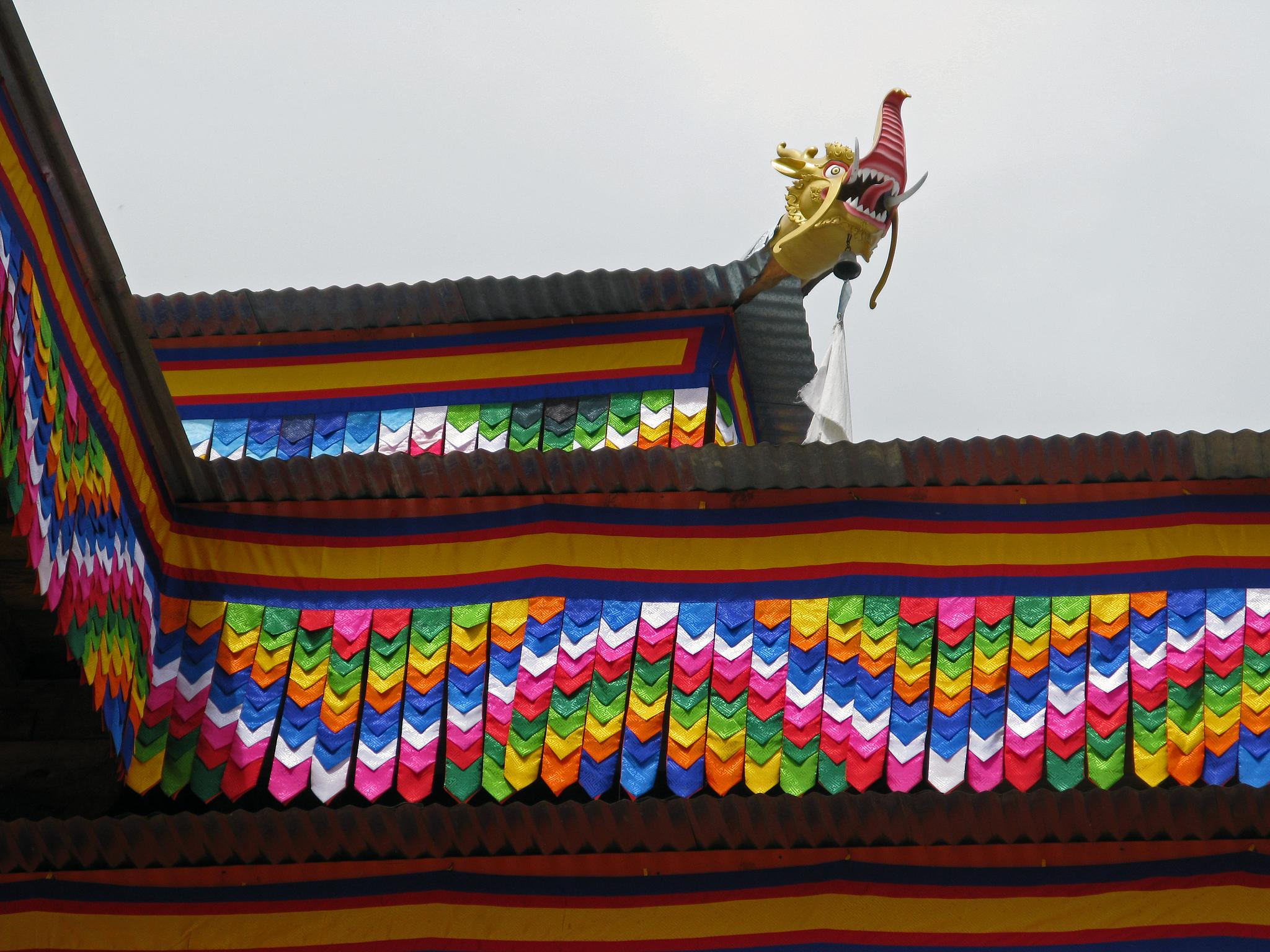
An architectural feature of the roof of the refurbished Gangteng Monastery

The detailed layout and the holy images and frescos contained in the various buildings of the Gangten Gonpa complex are elaborated, starting with the four directions of the Gönpa and the sacred and symbolic significance of the areas that surround the Gonpa. Located in the central region of Bhutan, the precincts are forested with medicinal plants and trees. The sacred places that are in the region, in the four directions are: on the east – the Gayney Lhakhang in Bumthang; in the south – the Moenyul Namkha Dzong; in the west – the Paro Taktsang; and in the north – Namthang Lu Gi Phu, the meditation cave of Guru Rinpoche. The Gonpa is located on a spur at the highest point, symbolic of the Vajrayana teachings and its practice. Its location at the base is intertwined with nine large mountain peaks, symbolising the ninth "yana". It has no problem of wild animals, which is indicative of lack of sufferings. The sky above appears in the form of the eight-spiked wheel, which is symbolic of the yogic practitioners of Dzogchen. The land where the Gonpa is located is an "equanimity and altruistic intention of Bodhicitta." It has eight auspicious signs indicative of an assembly of the noble sons and daughters from all directions. The precincts depict "a victory banner in the east, long horns in the south, six-syllable mantra in the west and stupa in the north," symbolising natural realization; further, the sun and moon rise early and set late, the three perennial rivers flow nearby and the spur where the Gonpa is located appears like an elephant – an auspicious sign.

The ten qualities of the precincts of the Gonpa are elaborated: the surrounding mountains and forests that enclose the Gonpa are like the 16 great Arhats with their entourage of close followers; the white road of Langleygang represents the eastern grey Tiger, there is the blue Zhungchu Ngoenmo, which symbolises the southern blue Dragon; red rock in Trawanang represents the western red Bird; the pastoral meadow of Tsi Tsi La symbolises the northern black Turtle; the four local protectors known as Sadags represent non-destruction by the four elements; there is the evergreen 'Wish-fulfilling Tree' (Paksam Joenshing) that symbolises spiritual and temporal prosperity; upper, middle and the lower sub-regions of the area represent the particular teachings of the 'Three Baskets'; and the retreat centres have dedicated male and female practitioners of Buddhism. Given these auspicious environment, Gangtey Gönpa has: A square plan that denotes perfection in teachings and practice; it has large fencing around it that protects it from evil influences; the monastery has three entrances representing "the doors of the three Yogas"; 108 doors and windows are provided to denote cleansing of the darkness of sentients; the images are painted and embossed, as protective compassion; Mandalas are depicted – the outer level Mandala is of the Mahayoga, the inner level Mandala denotes the Anuyoga and the secret level Mandala is of Atiyoga.

On the ground floor, images of the Buddhas of the 3 times similar to the ones in Magadha, Vajrasana and Yangpachen are deified. Next to these are the images of 4 other Buddhas, the 8 Noble Sons, the Great Teacher; wrathful form of Hayagriva, and Vajrapani flank them. The Assembly Hall has Jangchub Tungsha and offering goddesses. While at the sides of the entrance are the Kings of the 4 directions namely, "the Mandala of Cyclic Existence, layout of Mt. Meru according to the sutras and tantras, Zangdog Pelri and the Pureland of Shambala." The first floor is where the successive Trilkus have lived, which has three shrine rooms of the Dharmapalas and the Treasury with the Namsey Phodrang. The second floor is where the Lamai Lhakhang with the statue of Vajrasattva surrounded by the Peling lineage holders are deified. The complete Nyingma Gyud Bum texts are located on the eastern side. The Tshengye Lhakhang is on the southern side where the statues of the eight manifestations of Guru Rinpoche, canonical texts and eight red-sandalwood Desheg Chortens are seen. The living quarters are to the east and west of the Gonpa. The west also has the Amitayus Lhakhang with the statue of Buddha Amitayus with his companions. The Machen Lhakhang is located to the north where the reliquary stupa with embalmed body of the 6th Gangteng Tulku Tenpai Nyima is located. It also houses statues of the 16 Arhats.

The 11-faced Avalokiteśvara Lhakhang is at the entrance to the main temple. The Shedra's Assembly Hall and the Kezang Lhakhang flank the main temple. The living quarters of the monks are built on all four sides. The monastery also has a unique collection of armoury and weapons along with ritual paraphernalia.

Consecration ceremony

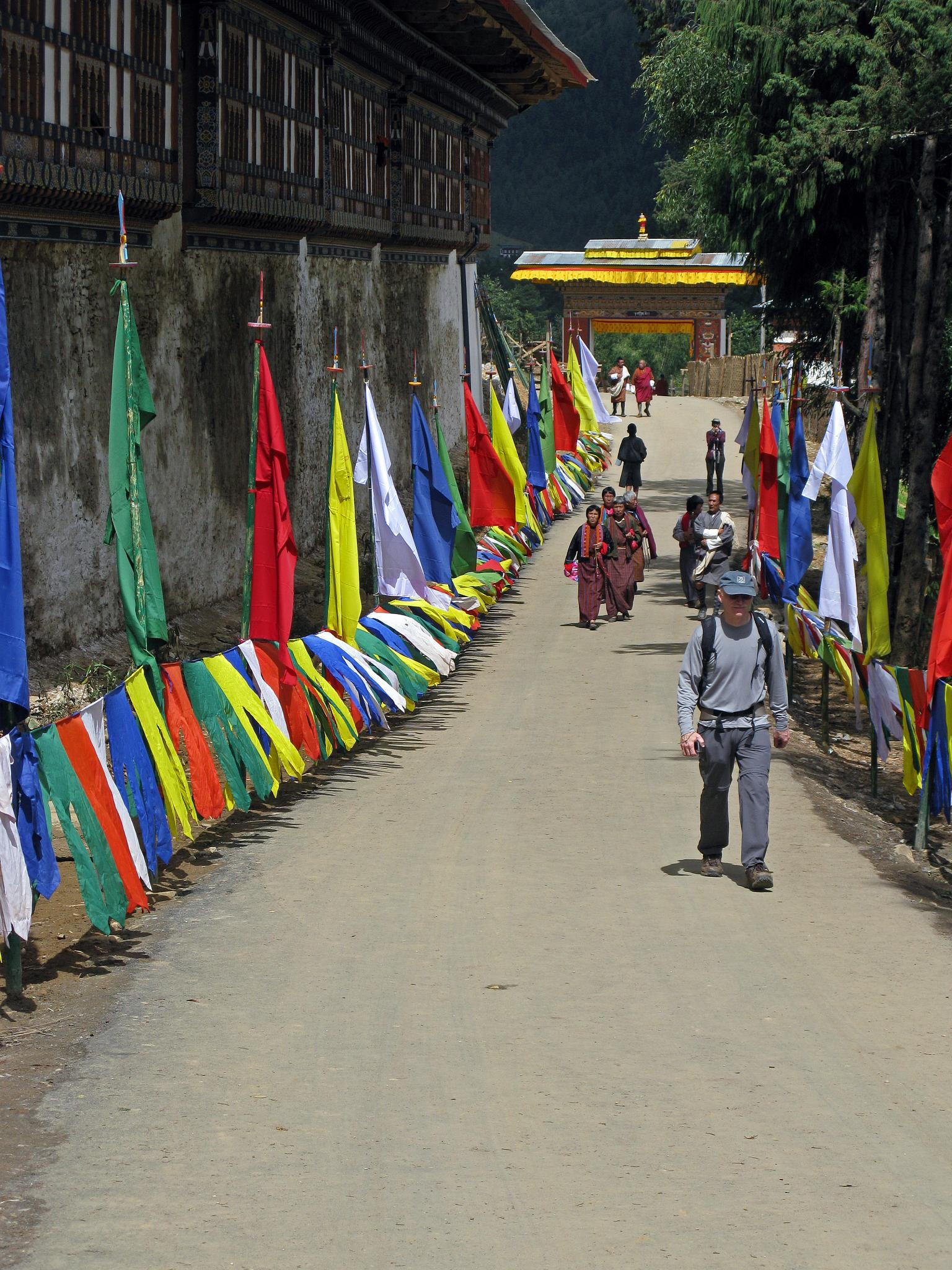
Festival street festooned with colourful prayer flags

The consecration ceremony, which was held on October 10, 2008 (on the auspicious 11th day of the 8th month of the Earth Rat Year according to the Bhutanese calendar), was a grand ceremony, which was not only graced by the Fourth King of Bhutan accompanied by his Queen and the royal family members and the Prime Minister with his Ministers but also by all descendants of Pema Lengpa. The hymnal extracts from the original sacred Peling scripture discovered by Terton Pema Lingpa in south Tibet and the Gurdag, dedicated to the wrathful form of Guru Rinpoche, were recited and the consecration rites performed in the four cardinal directions of the monastery. These rites were performed by monks, nuns and lay monks drawn from the 13 religious institutions that follow the Peling tradition. Local residents of the Phobjika Valley, and large number of students of the monastery under the tutelage of the present Trulku were also witness to the ceremony. The audience included devotees from Khunnu village in Himachal Pradesh, India, who were disciples of Pema Lingpa. Michael McClelland, who was associated with the restoration works right from the start said after the consecration ceremony that it was a "terrific experience to see the restoration and the consecration. He said he was struck by the sheer beauty of the Lhakhang and the organisation of the consecration ceremony. It's a once in a lifetime experience." The day following the consecration ceremony, the annual Tsechu and mask dances were held at the Gonpa. An exhibition of traditional arts and crafts was also part of the celebration for the next seven days.

The monastery and the Phobjika valley are covered under a blanket of snow during winter months of January and February when all the monks and the people of the valley shift, numbering about 4,500, temporarily to Wangdue Phodrong.

== Gangtey trek ==
Gangtey treks are a popular tourism attraction in the Phobjikha Valley which covers the Gangtey Gonpa. It is a trekking route followed by international trekking enthusiasts that starts from the Gangteng Gonpa in the Phobjika valley. It passes through the Kumbu village (east of the Gonpa), goes through the Gedachen and Khebayathang villages, leads to the Kilhorthang village and terminates in the Kungathang Lhakhang. A short trek of about 90 minutes, known as the Gangte Nature Trail, starts from the mani stone wall to the north of the Gangtey Gonpa and ends in Khewa Lhakhang.

== Festival ==
Tsechu, the popular Bhutanese festival that is held all over Bhutan in all major monasteries and in district towns in Bhutan, is also held here from the 5th to 10th days of the eighth lunar month, as per the Bhutanese calendar. The festival attracts many foreign tourists.

In addition, the Crane Festival which marks the arrival of Black-necked Cranes from the Tibetan plateau during the winter months and which are held as a religious blessing by the people, is also a big event not only in the Phobjika Valley but also in this monastery. It is held on 12 November, every year, which is a day after the celebration of the King's birthday.

== Throne holders ==
The nine 'Successive Throne Holders of Gangteng Monastery' starting with Gyalsé Pema Thinley to the present Kunzang Rigdzin Pema Namgyal, are listed below.

1. Gyalsé Pema Thinley (རྒྱལ་སྲས་པདྨ་ཕྲིན་ལས, bn:পে-মা-'ফ্রিন-লাস (ভূটান)) (1564–1642). He was the grandson of the famous Tertön Pema Lingpa. He built the Gonpa in 1613 and was the first Tulku or religious leader of the monastery.
2. Tenzin Legpé Döndrup (བསྟན་འཛིན་ལེགས་པའི་དོན་གྲུབ, bn:ব্স্তান-'দ্জিন-লেগ্স-পা'ই-দোন-গ্রুব) (1645–1727). He succeeded Gyalsé Pema Thinley, as the second Tulku and was responsible for enlarging the monastery substantially. He built it when he was 59 years old. It was built aesthetically like a Dzong or fortress with help of divine forces, as also local people.
3. Kunzang Thinley Namgyal (ཀུན་བཟང་ཕྲིན་ལས་རྣམ་རྒྱལ, bn:কুন-ব্জাং-'ফ্রিন-লাস-র্নাম-র্গ্যাল) (1727–1758). He was made the third Tulku when he was very young and he was very accomplished in the canonical texts (Kanjur), Nyingma Lineage Teachings (Nyingma Gyudbum). However, he died at a young age of 32.
4. Tenzin Sizhi Namgyal (བསྟན་འཛིན་སྲིད་ཞི་རྣམ་རྒྱལ, bn:ব্স্তান-'দ্জিন-স্রিদ-ঝি-র্নাম-র্গ্যাল) (1759–1790). He was the fourth Tulku. He was proficient in all the rituals, teachings and dances of the Palden Drukpa tradition, which are observed even now at the Gangteng Gönpa. He died at a young age of 31.
5. Ugyen Gelek Namgyal (ཨོ་རྒྱན་དགེ་ལེགས་རྣམ་རྒྱལ, bn:ও-র্গ্যান-দ্গে-লেগ্স-র্নাম-র্গ্যাল) (1791–1840). As the fifth Tulku, he acquired complete knowledge of the sutras, tantra and grammar from the 6th Peling Sungtrul who was then a renowned master. He taught the Buddha Dharma extensively to a large group of monks. He died at the age of 49.
6. Tenpai Nyima (བསྟན་པའི་ཉི་མ, bn:ও-র্গ্যান-ব্স্তান-পা'ই-ন্যি-মা) (1838–1874). He was the sixth Tulku and he belonged to Dungkar Chöje family while his younger brother belonged to the lineage of the Bönbi Chöje of Mangde in Trongsa. He perfected several dance forms for the Dungkar Tsechu dance festival, which is even now linked to Dungkar Chöje. He was also instrumental in finding religious treasures in eastern Bhutan. He introduced many innovations in the annual tradition of performing Tsechu rituals and mask dances at the Gangteng Gönpa.
7. Tenpai Nyinjé (བསྟན་པའི་ཉིན་བྱེད, bn:ও-র্গ্যান-ব্স্তান-পা'ই-ন্যিন-ব্যেদ) (1875–1905). He became the seventh Tulku of the Gonpa at a young age and was tutored in advance Buddhist scriptures by masters in the field. He diverted all the gifts and donations he received for improving the monastery. He was responsible for fixing a gilded spire on the central tower (Utse) of the monastery. He was also responsible for adding many treasures and freshly painted frescoes to the Gonpa. When the monastery was damaged by an earthquake, he and his brothers tirelessly and with all their resources restored the Gonpa to a better state. He died at a young age of 30.
8. Ugyen Thinley Dorji (ཨོ་རྒྱན་ཕྲིན་ལས་རྡོ་རྗེ, pl:Gangteng Tulku Rinpocze Ogjen Dżinle Dordże) (1906–1949). He was the son of Thimphu Dzongpon Kunzang Thinley and his wife, Sangay Drolma. His sister was the first Queen of Bhutan, Ashi Tsundue Pema Lhamo. He belonged to the Peling and the Nyö lineages. He was enthroned as the eight Tulku of the Gonpa at a young age. He introduced the practice of wearing the national dress gho among his disciples. He succeeded his father as the Thimphu Dzongpon. During this tenure, he constructed the Guru Lhakhang in Thimphu. He died in 1949 at Wangdue Phodrang. However, his body was cremated in Gangteng Gonpa.
9. Kunzang Rigdzin Pema Namgyal (རིག་འཛིན་པདྨ་རྣམ་རྒྱལ, pl:Gangteng Tulku Rinpocze Rikdzin Künsang Pema Namgjal) (b. 1955). He is the ninth Tulku of the Gonpa. He has royal lineage; his father belonged to the Bönbi Chöje: while his mother belonged to the Tibetan King Trisong Deutsen's lineage. He is western educated and stated to be the reincarnation of the mind of Pema Lingpa. His specialization and lineage are also in the spiritual orders of the Nyingma and Kagyu traditions. In addition to Gangteng Monastery, he is in charge of 35 other monasteries, temples, hermitages and universities in Bhutan. A study and meditation centre for women and girls, the first of its kind in Bhutan, is also to his credit. He has disciples throughout the Himalayan countries, India, Europe, North America, Asia and Africa.

== Religious institutions ==
At the command of the fourth King, Jigme Singye Wangchuck, a Buddhist college and a meditation centre have been established at Gangteng Gönpa to propagate the Buddhist Dharma with support from the Royal Government of Bhutan, in 1985. During this time, Gyal Yum Phuntsho Choden supported this initiative by sponsoring the construction of three large statues of Buddha, Guru Rinpoche and Rigdzin Pema Lingpa and the temple housing many precious contents. In addition to this, the private secretary of the Gyal Yum, Lopen Phub Dorji was motivated to gift including many articles of offerings to the Gönpa. Following this, 35 new and old subsidiary meditation and learning centres of the Gangteng Gönpa have been established in the country.

== Gallery ==
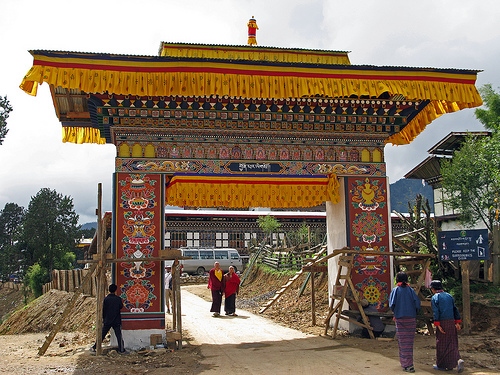
Entrance Gate to Gangteng Monastery after restoration

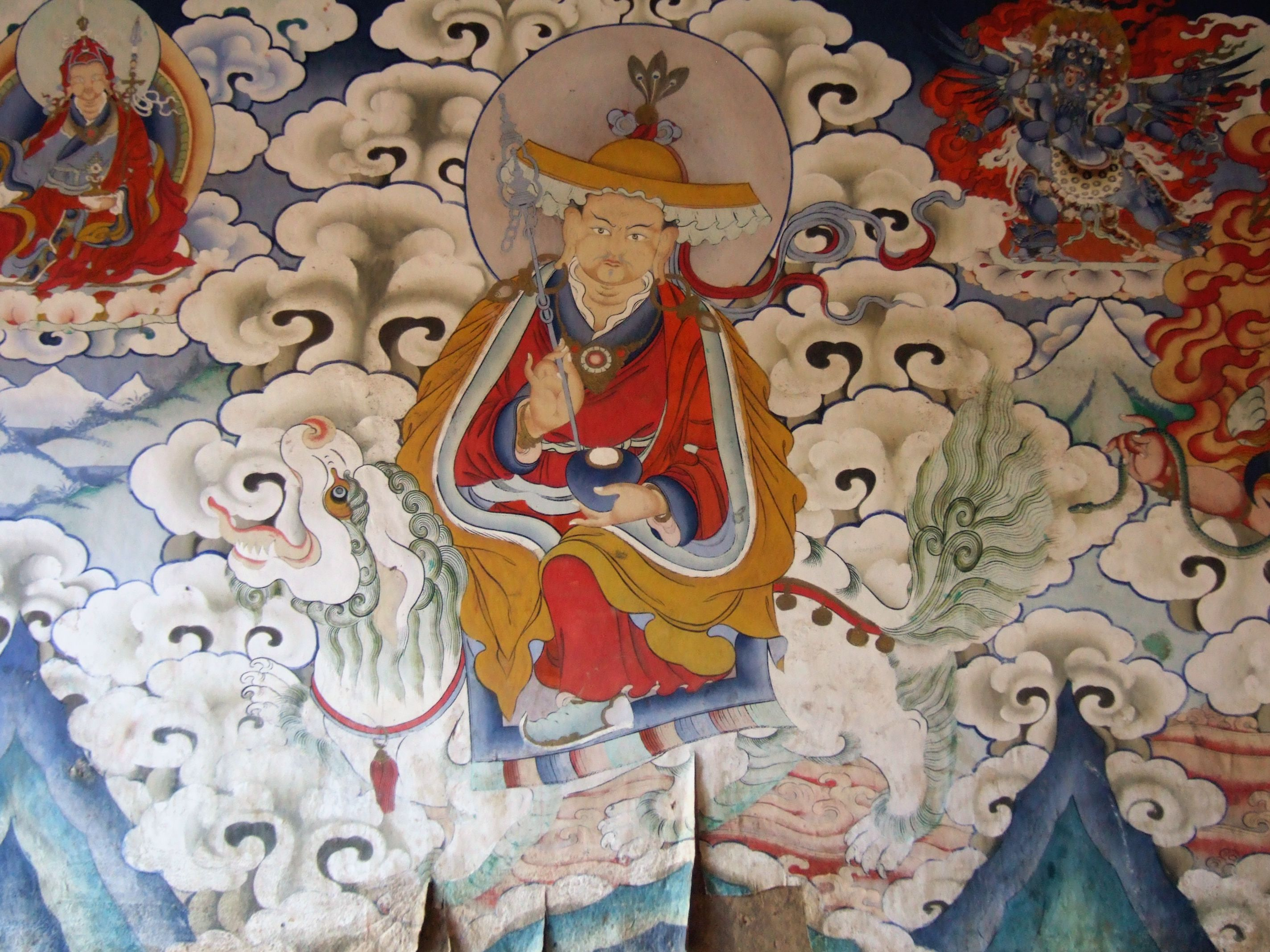
Gyalpo Dharma protector. Detail of a modern mural painted in the gateway of Gangteng Gonpa monastery.

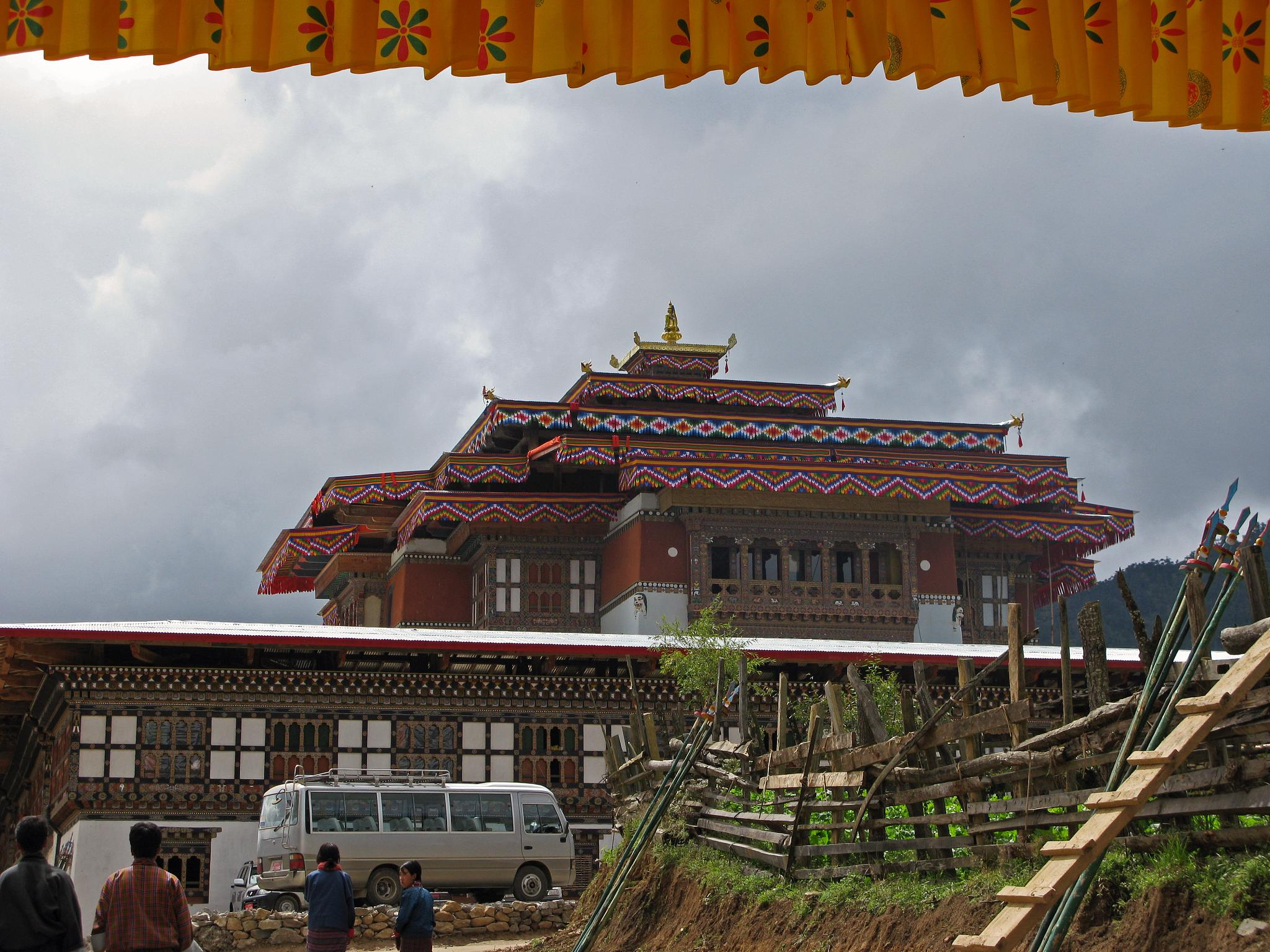
A view of the Gangteng Monastery from the road

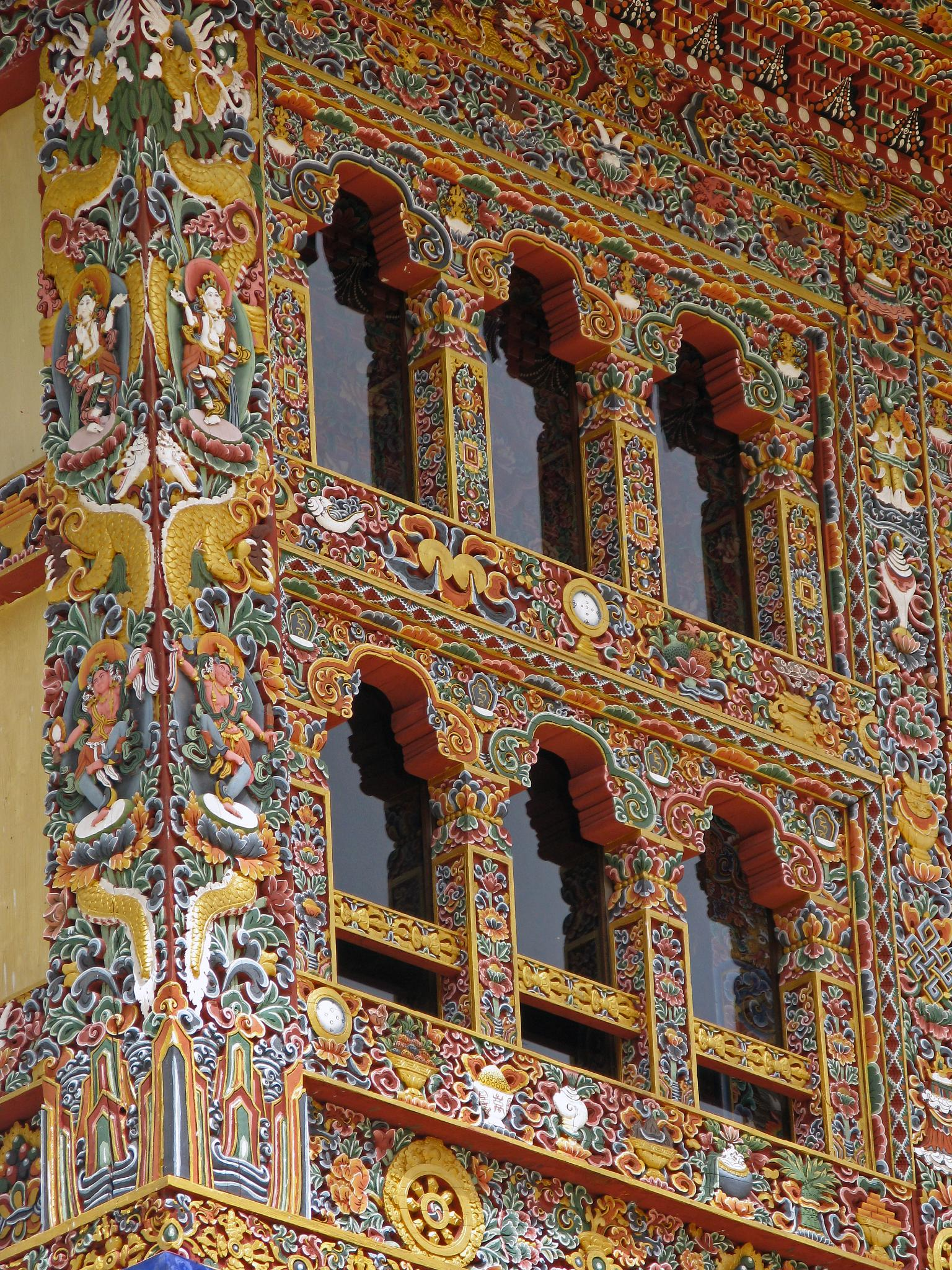
Details of the prayer hall of the Gangteng Monastery

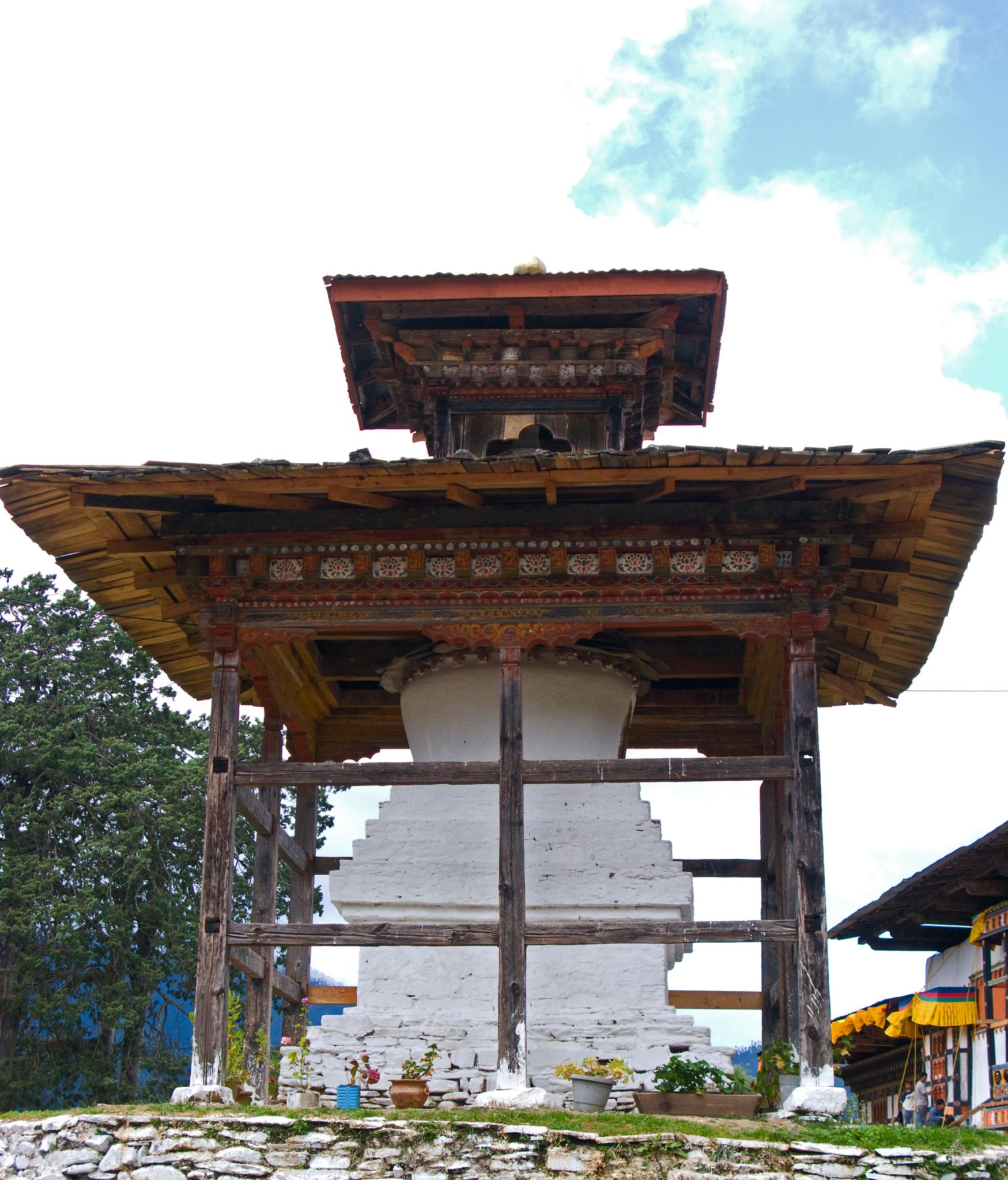
A Chorten within the precincts of the Monastery complex
