= Gyetsa =

- Location in Bhutan
- Coordinates: 27°31′N 90°38′E
- Country: Bhutan
- District: Bumthang District
- Time zone: UTC+6 (BTT)

Gyetsa is a town in Bumthang District in central Bhutan.
