= List of bridges in Bhutan =

This is a list of bridges and viaducts in Bhutan, including those for pedestrians and vehicular traffic.

== Historical and architectural interest bridges ==
Cantilever beams were developed in order to cross increasingly wide streams or rivers, for which simple wooden beams had an insufficient range of about 10 meters. Two arms with superimposed timber are built on either side of the river, above the highest flood-level point, while being weighted to allow an increasingly large cantilevering, and solid wooden beams are then fixed on each end of the arms with wooden pegs. Bridges of this type were very common in mountainous region of India, Nepal, and Tibet with an average span of 20 metres (66 ft), but those from Bhutan have the particularity of being more elaborate with stone masonry bridge towers, roofed with wooden shingles above the abutments or bridge head structures. The main purpose of these towers was to act as a counterweight to stiffen the structure.

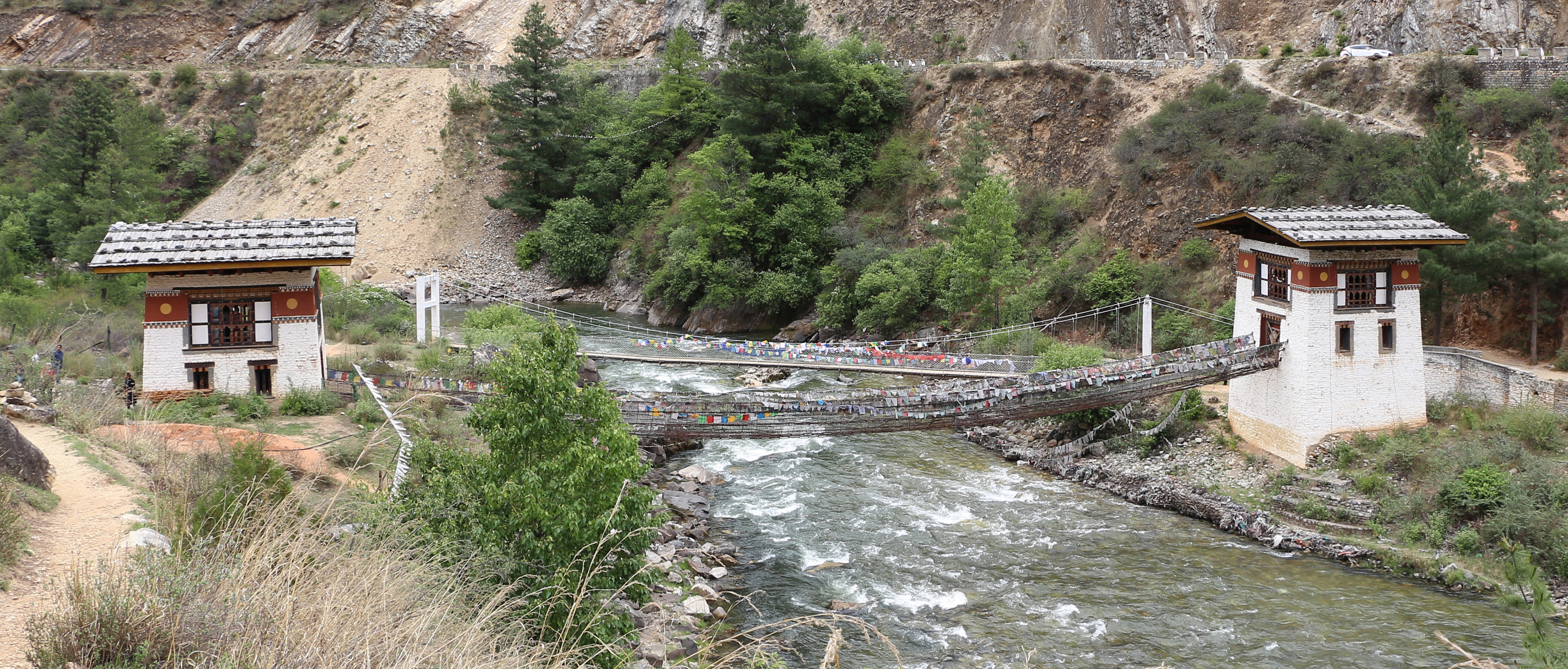
A traditional suspension bridge in the foreground and a modern one in the background

The use of more layers of wooden beams with more pronounced inclinations allow for greater spans; one of the most significant examples is the Wangdue Zam with a span reported from 112 to 180 feet (34.1 to 54.9 m) according to different sources. The renovation of the Punakha Bridge in the city of the same name in 2008 by a Swiss company using this technique reached a span of 55 metres (180 ft), the largest for this type of bridge in Bhutan.

All these bridges are called Bazam, a word composed of Ba which means Cattle, and Zam which is the word for Bridge in Dzongkha, the national language of Bhutan. This comes from the resemblance of the cantilever beams that sit opposite each other with two noses of cattle.

A major innovation was created by Thang Tong Gyalpo regarding the crossing of large spans, he developed iron chains working techniques and adapted them to the construction of bridges. By adding arsenic to the iron (a bit more than 2.8%), it became easier to work with and had good resistance against rust; some of these chains are still functional today. This made it possible to reach spans to over a hundred meters, which had not yet been reached in Europe at this time; the Chushul Chakzam in Tibet is reported to be 150 yards (140 m) long.

After making more than a hundred such bridges in Tibet, Thang Tong Gyalpo came to Bhutan in 1433 where he found iron ore deposits and locals blacksmiths; many chains forged here were shipped from Bhutan to Tibet. He build 8 bridges in the country, oftentime near ore deposits, and some of them were still in use in the 20th century; the last existing bridges are Tamchog Chakzam, Doksum Chakzam, Dangme Chakzam, and Khoma Chakzam (Chakzam literally means "iron bridge" in standard Tibetan).

	Name	Dzongkha	Distinction	Length	Type	Carries Crosses	Opened	Location	District	Ref.
1	Tamchog Chakzam rebuilt in 2005		Built by Thang Tong Gyalpo		Suspension; Chain bridge, masonry towers	Footbridge; Paro Chhu	1433	Tamchog Lhakhang; 27°19′46.7″N 89°30′16.7″E	Paro District	(Note: The Tamchog Chakzam was washed away in a flood in 1969, he still had his iron chains on that date. For the reconstruction in 2005, four chains were recovered from the river and four others were brought from the dismantled Doksum Chakzam in East Bhutan.)
2	Punakha Bridge rebuilt in 2008	Puna Mochhu Bazam	Span : 55 m (180 ft); Punakha Dzong	73 m (240 ft)	Covered bridge Cantilever wooden beam, 2 masonry towers	Footbridge; Mo Chhu	1637	Punakha; 27°34′59.8″N 89°51′42.4″E	Punakha District	(Note: The rupture and fall of a glacier into a lake in 1958 created a devastating wave that swept the Mo-Chhu River for miles, taking with it the tree trunks that destroyed the cantilever bridge. The west tower, on the side of the dzong, spared was preserved during the restoration of 2006-2008, the other tower was shifted by 20 metres (66 ft) (the old bridge had a span of 35 metres (115 ft).)
3	Nemi Zam		Rinpung Dzong	24 m (79 ft)	Covered bridge Cantilever wooden beam, 2 masonry towers	Footbridge; Paro Chhu	18th century	Paro; 27°25′29.1″N 89°25′18.7″E	Paro District	(Note: Also called Paro Dzong Covered Bridge or Nyamai Zam Footbridge.)
4	Wangdue Zam destroyed in 1968		Constructed without using single piece of iron § Wangdue Phodrang Dzong		Covered bridge Cantilever wooden beam, 3 masonry towers	Footbridge; Sankosh River	18th century	Wangdue Phodrang; 27°28′29.1″N 89°53′42.7″E	Wangdue Phodrang District	(Note: Also called Wangdü, Wangdi or Wandipore Bridge, the date of construction is between 1684 and the mid-18th century, its span has been reported from 112 to 180 feet (34.1 to 54.9 m).)
5	Dotanang Covered Bridge			46 m (151 ft)	Covered bridge Cantilever wooden beam, 2 masonry towers	Footbridge; Raidāk River (Wang Chhu)	19th century	Dotanang; 27°35′37.0″N 89°37′45.1″E	Thimphu District	
6	Kuendeyling Baazam				Covered bridge Cantilever wooden beam, 2 masonry towers	Footbridge; Raidāk River (Wang Chhu)		Thimphu; 27°28′30.4″N 89°38′32.3″E	Thimphu District	
7	Langjo Bridge		Tashichho Dzong		Covered bridge Cantilever wooden beam, 2 masonry towers	Footbridge; Raidāk River (Wang Chhu)		Thimphu; 27°29′30.7″N 89°38′09.0″E	Thimphu District	(Note: The bridge was mentioned by John Claude White during his expedition in Bhutan between 1887 and 1908.)
8	Changjiji Bridge			29 m (95 ft)	Covered bridge Cantilever wooden beam, 2 masonry towers	Footbridge; Raidāk River (Wang Chhu)	2007	Thimphu; 27°27′22.4″N 89°38′56.2″E	Thimphu District	(Note: Rebuilt in 2021.)
9	Punakha Suspension Bridge				Suspension; Steel	Footbridge; Pho Chhu		Punakha; 27°35′20.3″N 89°52′11.8″E	Punakha District	

== Major road bridges ==
This table presents the structures with spans greater than 100 metres (330 ft) (non-exhaustive list).

	Name	Dzongkha	Span	Length	Type	Carries Crosses	Opened	Location	District	Ref.
1	Amochhu Bridge			175 m (574 ft)	Arch; Steel through arch	Road bridge Torsa River	2018	Phuntsholing; 26°53′10.1″N 89°20′06.4″E	Chukha District; Samtse District	
2	Diana Kuephen Bridge			320 m (1,050 ft)	Suspension; Steel truss deck, steel pylons	Road bridge Samtse–Sipsu road	2003	Samtse; 26°55′37.1″N 89°02′34.1″E	Samtse District	
3	Panbang Bridge			152 m (499 ft)	Arch; Steel through arch	Road bridge Manas River	2013	Panbang; 26°51′10.3″N 90°57′41.3″E	Zhemgang District	

== See also ==
- Transport in Bhutan
- Geography of Bhutan
- List of rivers of Bhutan
- Architecture of Bhutan

== Notes and references ==
- Notes
- Nicolas Janberg. "International Database for Civil and Structural Engineering". Structurae.com.
- Others references
