= Glaciers in Bhutan =

The glaciers in Bhutan, which covers about 3 percent of the total surface area, are responsible for feeding all rivers of Bhutan except the Amochu and Nyere Amachu.

Not much historical information is available on these glacial systems; the first modern survey was conducted by Augusto Gansser-Biaggi in the 1970s, who developed a chronology of past glaciations, and warned of imminent glacial lake outburst floods (GLOF) in Lunana. This prompted the Geological Survey of India (GSI) and Geological Survey of Bhutan (GSB) to carry out joint surveys in the mid-80s, and their report rejected Biaggi's threat-assessment. On 7 October 1994, a GLOF from Luggye lake (part of Lunana glacial system) led to over 20 fatalities in Punakha.

This disaster, the first of its kind in Modern Bhutan, increased the frequency of glacial-system-surveys by manifold. Evaluation of GLOF hazard has since formed a significant component of glacial expeditions. Multiple inventory-lists of glaciers and glacial lakes in Bhutan exist. The precise figures vary to some extent, based on the methodology used.

== Inventories ==
=== Glaciers ===
Multiple trans-Himalayan inventories of variable accuracy and area-span have existed for decades. This section concerns with inventories specifically curated for Bhutan.

The first inventory was compiled in 1996 by Phuntso Norbu (of the Division of Geology and Mines) using satellite data from 1989 to 1990 and topographic map of 1962/63. A revised edition was published in 1999 by GSB. The same year, another inventory was published by China Science Publishing & Media on the basis of near-infrared Landsat 2 imagery (1975–1978) and some aerial snapshots — 649 glaciers were located, covering an area of 1,304 km^{2}. and a volume of 150 cubic kilometer. A more accurate inventory, prepared from 1993 SPOT Imagery, Landsat data of 90s, IRS-1D data of 1999, and GSI topographic maps of 1950-60s, was published in 2001 by the International Center for Integrated Mountain Development (ICIMOD). 677 glaciers, covering an area of 1,317 km^{2} were located and classified per Müllerian (WGMS) nomenclature.

In 2011, ICIMOD recompiled its data-set for the entire Hindu Kush, using an automated classification of satellite imagery from 2005 ± 3 years in combination with digital elevation model — the area was revised to 642 km^{2} (based on Bhutan's new national boundary). In 2012, data from World Glacier Inventory (WGI), Global Land Ice Measurements from Space (GLIMS), and Natural Earth (NE) were blended and refined to create yet another inventory of glaciers — the area estimates came out to be 1930 km^{2}. (did not take the new boundary into account). The ICIMOD database was updated in 2014 (using Landsat imagery from 2010) — no areal difference existed.

In 2018, the National Center for Hydrology and Meteorology published the most recent inventory of glaciers in Bhutan using automatic classification of Sentinel-2 data from 2016 — 700 glaciers were located covering an area of about 629.55 km^{2}.

== Glaciers ==
By convention, glaciers are located in the river basins, they lie — Wang Chhu basin (consisting of Pa Chhu, Ha Chhu and Thim Chhu sub basins), Punatshang Chhu basin (consisting of Pho Chhu, Mo Chhu and Dang Chhu sub basins), and Manas Basin (consisting of Mangde Chhu, Chamkhar Chhu, Kuri Chhu, and Drangme Chhu sub-basins). Two other river basins exist in Bhutan corresponding to Amo Chhu and Nyere Ama Chhu but is not associated with any glacier.

In order of area (or volume), the vast majority are classifiable as "valley glacier", and "mountain glacier". "Ice apron", and "niche glacier" types exist in significant numbers but occupy far less area (or volume). Far rarer are "cirque glaciers", and "ice caps". The "valley glaciers" are located along the southern flanks of the main topographic divide of the Bhutan Himalaya, and are characterized by debris-mantled snouts. They are primarily concentrated in the upper part of the Pho Chhu basin and Northern Basin. "Mountain glaciers" are common on peaks, and back walls of valley glaciers. "Cirque glaciers", "ice caps", "ice aprons", and "niche glaciers" are common on plateaus and ridges that stretch to the south from the main Himalayan divide; they are virtually debris-free. Rock glaciers exist in many places along the Snowman Trekking Route in northwestern and northern Bhutan. The south flowing glaciers exhibit steeper head-walls, more debris cover, and slower flow rates than their north-flowing counterparts.

As of 2016, the Punatsang Chhu basin contained the highest number of glaciers (341) with an area of about 361.07 km^{2} and the Wang Chhu Basin had the lowest number of glaciers (47) with an area of about 33.38 km^{2}. The largest glacier (2016) is in the Mangde Chhu sub basin, having an area of 45.85 km^{2}. The longest glacier (2001) is the Wachey Glacier in Pho Chhu river-basin, measuring about 20.1 km. The highest elevation (2016) of glacier basins is at about 7,361 m in the Mangde Chhu basin. Lowest snout-elevations (2001) are found to be slightly above 4,000 m, for glaciers in the Kuri Chhu basin and Drangme Chhu basin; debris free glaciers exhibit lower snouts.

=== Retreat ===
Several programs concerned with monitoring trans-Himalayan glaciers are underway, and a heterogeneous shrinkage is the general rule. Most of the glaciers in Bhutan are summer-accumulation type and hence, even more sensitive to fluctuations in temperature. However, equilibrium line altitude (ELA) information is scarce and little rigorous data on glacier changes are available due to issues in accessing higher-altitude glaciers. In general, it is accepted that glaciers are significantly retreating; the precise causes remain unknown but generally, retreats serve as highly sensitive indicators of climate change.

Significant evidence about retreat in lower-elevation glaciers exists. A 1999 publication, deriving from satellite images, maps, and survey data, reported the retreat of multiple glaciers in the Bhutan Himalayas. A 2003 digital survey of 103 debris-free glaciers (small, and of similar length) from 1963 to 1993 determined that 90 were retreating, 13 were stationary, and none was advancing. The magnitude of retreat was larger in the south and smaller in the north, probably because of the higher sensitivity of glacier mass balance to relatively warmer temperature and greater precipitation in the south. Excluding the ones with unclear variations, an areal comparison of 66 glaciers exhibited an 8.1% shrinkage. In-situ observations of several glaciers in the 80s and 90s have pointed towards retreat.

A 2012 conservative modelling predicted significant retreat (and shrinkage) in the ensuing decades to attain stability with mean climate conditions absent a near-double increase in precipitation or significant regional cooling. A 2.5 C increase in regional temperature over the next century (as predicted by IPCC) will reduce glaciated area by half and bring meltwater discharges to negligible values. These were however not validated with in-situ observations. In 2016, the first ever in-situ mass-balance record of a glacier (Gangju La; debris free) in Bhutan was published. It recorded a drastic reduction in mass to the extent that no accumulation zone existed at all, and the observations were in agreement with the 2012 model. The authors noted that remote sensing methodologies indeed estimated far lower mass-losses, as hypothesized in the model.

A 2014 analysis by ICIMOD on the evolution of Bhutan glaciers (using Landsat imagery) from 1980 to 2010 concluded that the glaciers were rapidly shrinking in recent decades. From 1980 to 2010, net area had roughly shrank by 23%; absence of debris and presence of a glacial lake at snout accentuated these retreat rates. The numbers increased by about 14.8% due to fragmentation of existing glaciers.

==== Effects and mitigation ====
The consequences of glacier retreat remain poorly understood. Changes in river runoff, global sea-level rise, and increase in frequency of glacial lake outburst floods are probable. Decrease in meltwater discharge directly affects the viability of hydroelectric power production, which is one of the economic lifelines for Bhutan.

Bhutan was the first country to receive climate mitigation fund from the UN's Least Developed Countries fund.

== Glacial lakes ==
Some glacial lakes, such as Thorthormi Lake in Lunana Gewog, are not a single bodies of water but collections supraglacial ponds. Most glacial lakes identified as potentially dangerous feed into the Manas River and Puna Tsang (Sankosh) River water systems of north-central Bhutan. During a GLOF, residents of nearby downstream villages may have as little as twenty minutes to evacuate; floodwaters from one 1994 GLOF at Luggye lake took about seven hours to reach Punakha, some 90 kilometres (56 mi) downstream.

For public safety, these glaciers and glacial lakes are maintained by the Ministry of Economic Affairs' Department of Geology and Mines, an executive (cabinet) agency of the Government of Bhutan. The department, as part of its environmental "mitigation projects," aims to lower the levels of glacial lakes and thereby avert GLOF-related disaster. In 2001, for example, scientists identified Lake Thorthormi as one that threatened imminent and catastrophic collapse. The situation was eventually relieved by carving a water channel from the lip of the lake to relieve water pressure. The Department uses silent explosives and other means it considers environmentally friendly in order to minimize the ecological impact of its mitigation projects. These projects, however, remain difficult to conduct because of the weather, terrain, and relative lack of oxygen at the glacial lakes' altitudes. As of September 2010, GLOF early warning systems were slated for installation by mid-2011 in Punakha and Wangdue Phodrang districts at a cost of USD 4.2 million.

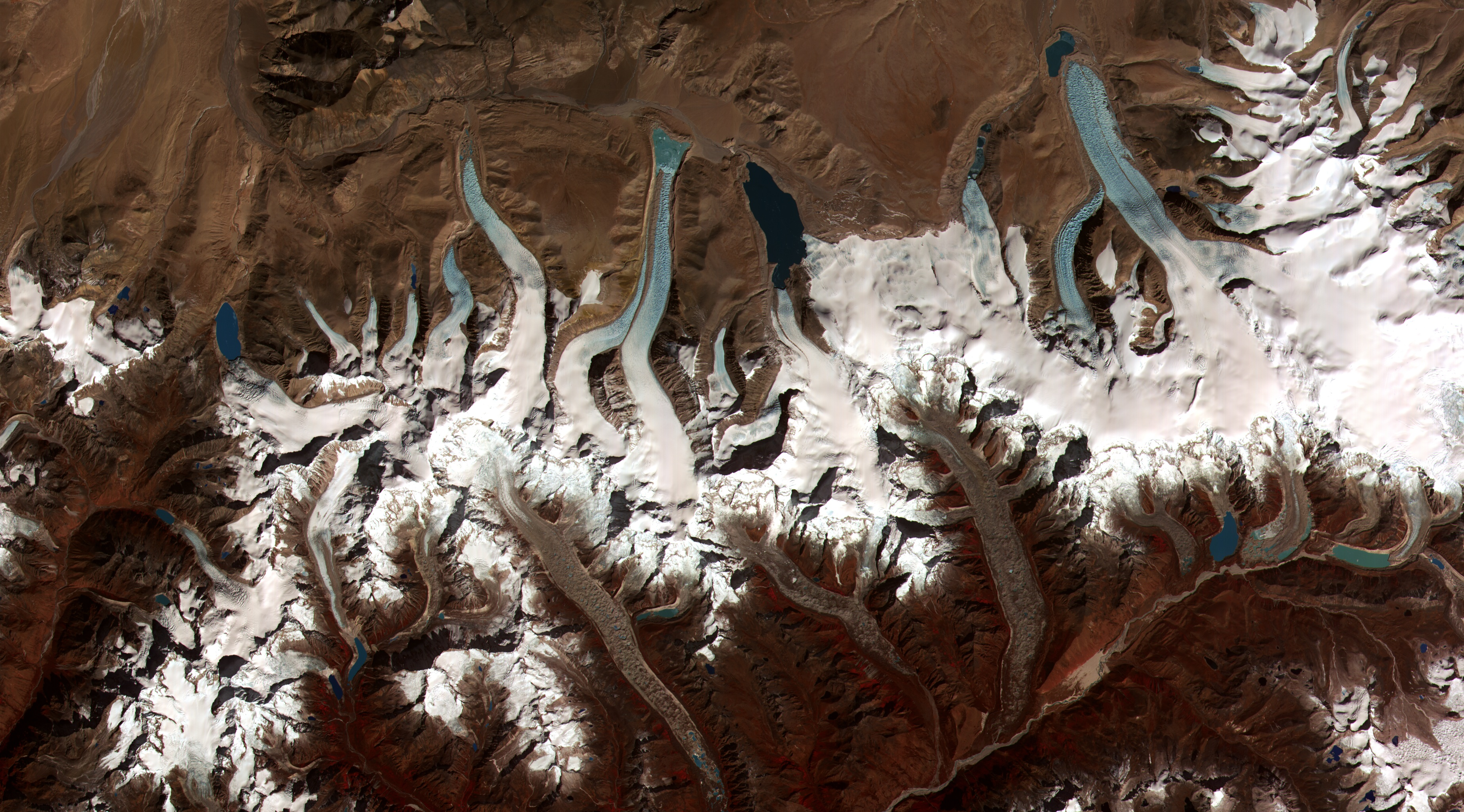
Glacial lakes in Bhutan (2002)

== See also ==
- Climate change
- Geography of Bhutan
- List of rivers of Bhutan
- Mountains of Bhutan
- Retreat of glaciers since 1850
