= Energy in Bhutan =

Bhutan electricity production

Energy in Bhutan has been a primary focus of development in the kingdom under its Five-Year Plans. In cooperation with India, Bhutan has undertaken several hydroelectric projects whose output is traded between the countries. Though Bhutan's many hydroelectric plants provide energy far in excess of its needs in the summer, dry winters and increased fuel demand makes the kingdom a marginal net importer of energy from India.

Bhutan’s installed power generation capacity is approximately 1.6 gigawatts (GW). Over 99 percent of the country's installed capacity comes from hydropower plants, accounting for 1,614 megawatts (MW) of the country’s total capacity of 1,623 MW in 2018.

More than 99.97 percent of households have access to electricity. As of 2011, the Bhutanese government supplied electricity to 60 percent of rural households, a significant increase from about 20 percent in 2003. About 2,500 people use solar power throughout Bhutan. Even where electricity was available for lighting, most rural households cooked by wood fire. Rural homes were often heated with firewood, kerosene, or liquefied petroleum gas.

Bhutan has no natural petroleum or natural gas reserves. The kingdom has some 1.3 million tonnes of coal reserves, but extracts only about 1,000 tonnes of coal yearly, entirely for domestic consumption. Bhutan also imports oil at some 1,000 barrels per day. Most oil imports supplied fuel for automobiles.

Bhutan remains overall carbon-neutral and a net sink for greenhouse gases. As Bhutan develops and modernizes, however, its domestic demand for energy in household, commercial, and industrial sectors has been steadily increasing.

== Government agencies and operations ==
Until 2002, Bhutan's energy sector was overseen by the Department of Power under the Ministry of Trade and Industry. In 2002, reforms in the executive body, the Lhengye Zhungtshog, produced three new agencies under the Ministry of Economic Affairs: the Department of Energy, its subsidiary Bhutan Electricity Authority, and the Bhutan Power Corporation. While the Department of Energy formulates policy, planning, and coordination, the Bhutan Electricity Authority is the main regulatory agency of the energy sector. Since 2006, the Electricity Authority has had the ability to impose differential tariff structures on low, medium, and high voltage consumers.

Through 2011, the Bhutan Power Corporation remained a publicly held corporation, comprising about 9 percent of the nation's civil service, though its long-term goals included privatization. In December, 2009, Bhutan Power Corporation had 91,770 customers across the country, out of which 47,846 were rural domestic users. It planned and built hydroelectric plants under a licensure scheme regulating the size and output of projects.

In January 2008, the government amalgamated its three wholly owned hydroelectric companies—Chukha Hydro Power Corporation, Basochhu Hydro Power Corporation, and Kurichhu Hydro Power Corporation—into Druk Green Power Corporation. In addition to its first three plants, Druk Green assumed control of Tala Hydropower Plant in 2009. Druk Green operates as a holding company to oversee and accelerate hydropower and alternative energy development.

Both the Bhutan Power Corporation and Druk Green are owned by Druk Holding and Investments, which exercises oversight in the investment and development activities of the energy companies. Both companies faced decreased profit margins largely because of losses due to increased energy price on repurchase from India.

== Production and consumption ==
In the early 21st century, about 70 percent of all energy consumption in Bhutan was in the household sector. Heating and cooking with firewood in particular accounted for between 70 and 90 percent of total energy consumption and virtually 100 percent of household energy consumption. In contrast, commercial activities in Bhutan were fueled mostly by hydroelectricity (about 97 percent), some fossil-fuel based thermal power (about 3 percent), and a minimal amount of other fossil fuels. As a result, Bhutan sold much of its hydroelectricity to India during summer months.

To date, the Bhutanese electric energy supply has been virtually entirely hydroelectric. Due to the vulnerability of the water supply amid climate change, the Bhutanese government began exploring alternative energies such as solar, wind, and biogas in the early 21st century. Climate change also poses risks to Bhutan as the country could suffer weather extremes causing more floods, intense monsoons, and glacier dam bursts in the summer and drought in the winter.

=== Hydropower plants ===
Bhutan's installed hydropower capacity stands at 1,615 megawatts as of 2016, out of an estimated hydropower potential of 30,000 megawatts (23,760 megawatts of which is considered technologically and economically feasible). Hydropower generation drops significantly in the winter due to mountain streams freezing over. On-grid hydropower is the country's main energy source.

Bhutan operates four major hydroelectric facilities, several small and mini hydroelectric generators, and has a handful of further sites in development. Many of the small and mini hydropower plants in Bhutan serve remote villages that remain disconnected from the power grid. Almost all of hydroelectric plants in Bhutan generate power through run-of-the-river hydroelectricity.

Earlier international aid efforts were mostly grants from India, though later projects became majority loan-based. Other sovereign and multinational contributors, including the government of Austria and the Asian Development Bank, have also funded and developed Bhutan's hydroelectric projects. In the early 2010s, Bhutan began to shift its focus to public-private partnerships for future development, however the process and requirements have operated to exclude many Bhutanese contracting firms.

==== Chukha Hydropower Project ====
The Chukha Hydropower Project, or Chukha Hydel, was Bhutan's first mega power project. Construction started in the 1970s with commissioning in 1986 and the government assuming full control in 1991. During the summer, the plant generates 336 MW from four turbines off the flow of the Wangchhu river in central Chukha District, between Thimphu and Phuentsholing. The project cost Nu2.46 billion, wholly funded by the Government of India, 60 percent under grants and 40 percent under a fifteen-year loan at 5 percent interest. In 2009, two diversion pipes from neighboring rivers were built to make up for the Wangchhu's decreased river flow during dry winter months.

Most of Chukha's energy is exported to West Bengal, Bihar, Jharkhand, Orissa, and Sikkim. Chukha was the kingdom's greatest source of income until the Tala Hydropower Project was commissioned in 2007. Between 2005 and 2006, Chukha alone contributed over 30 percent to Bhutan's total revenue. The plant is operated by Druk Green.

==== Tala Hydropower Project ====
Tala is a six-turbine conventional penstock hydroelectric facility located a few kilometers downstream from the Chukha plant in Chukha District. Tala has a generative capacity of 1,020 MW, sourced by some 40 kilometers of tunnel and a net drop of 860 meters in elevation. The facility also contains a 92 meter high concrete dam and underground power house. Since full operations began in 2007, it has surpassed Chukha as Bhutan's leading power site. Like Chukha, Tala was wholly financed by India, 60 percent by grant and 40 percent through loans. Druk Green assumed control of Tala in April 2009.

==== Kurichhu Hydropower Project ====
The Kurichhu Hydropower Project, located on the Kurichhu river in Mongar District, provides electricity to eight districts (Mongar, Lhuentse, Trashigang, Trashiyangtse, Pemagatshel, Samdrup Jongkhar, Sarpang, and Zhemgang) in eastern Bhutan. Like the Chukha project, Kurichhu was wholly financed by India, 60 percent in grants and 40 percent in loans.

The Kurichhu facility consists of a dam, its 1 million cubic meter capacity cement reservoir, and four turbines. The plant became operational on a staggered basis between April 2001 and May 2002. It generates 60 MW of electricity, much of which is exported to India. Druk Green operates the Kurichhu plant.

==== Basochhu Hydropower Project ====
The Basochhu power plants I and II, located near Wangdue Phodrang, were built with Austrian technical and financial assistance. Basochhu I has a capacity of 24 MW and Basochhu II has a capacity of 40MW. The plant is fully computerized. The plant's turbines are powered by water on a fall. Basochhu is operated by Druk Green.

The construction for Basochhu II was started in 1997, and operation began in 2004

==== Punatsangchhu-I Hydroelectric Project ====
As of September 2014, the 1,200 MW (6 x 200 MW) Punatsangchhu-I project between 7 km and 18.5 km downstream from Wangdue Phodrang Bridge is under construction. It is funded wholly by India, 40 percent by grant and 60 percent by loan. Construction began in November 2009 and completion is expected in 2025.

==== Punatsangchhu-II Hydroelectric Project ====
As of September 2014, the 1,020 MW (6 x 170 MW) Punatsangchhu-II project is under construction. Like other recent projects, it is funded wholly by India, 40 percent by grants and 60 percent by loans. Construction began in 2013 and completion was expected in 2022, but it seems to be put on hold.

==== Mangdechhu Hydroelectric Project ====
The project was conceived and designed by NHPC Ltd. (A Govt. of India Enterprise) and the major works were executed by Indian contractors. The project was commissioned by Bharat Heavy Electricals Limited (BHEL) in early August 2019, and was formally inaugurated by the Indian and Bhutanese Prime Ministers on 17 August 2019 from the capital city Thimphu, under the aegis of Bhutan-India Friendship Project. Like other recent projects, it is funded wholly by India, 40 percent by grants and 60 percent by loans. The power equipments and electro-mechanical machineries were supplied by BHEL from their various locations in India.

==== Dagachhu Hydropower Project ====
The 126 MW (CDM) Dagachhu project is located in Dagana District. Construction began in 2009 and the first generator was commissioned in February 2015. The Dagachhu plant is the first commercial power generation project in Bhutan.

==== Other projects ====
Below is a table of other major hydroelectric projects in Bhutan:

District	Site
Chukha District	(several sites in the south)
Lhuentse District	Tangmachhu
Mongar District	Kilikhar
Paro District	Chumdo
Paro District	Waisa
Pemagatshel District	Nganglam
Pemagatshel District	Nangkor
Samtse District	Phuentsholing
Samdrup Jongkhar District	Deothang
Sarpang District	Gelephu
Thimphu District	Olakha (two sites)
Thimphu District	Gemina
Trashigang District	Kanglung
Tsirang District	Dhalay
Wangdue Phodrang District	Rurichu
Zhemgang District	Tingtibi (two sites)

Bhutan also operates several small hydroelectric projects, with output capacities ranging between 12 MW and 0.36 MW.

In 2008, there were 24 even smaller mini-macro hydropower plants generating about 4 MW altogether. The largest of these were in Trashigang (Rangjung) and Bumthang (Chhumey). Bhutan's first mini-hydroelectric facility was built in 1967 in Thimphu; it operated until 1988. Until the 1970s, Bhutan constructed many other small hydroelectric plants. During the 1970s, Bhutan and India began to partner on larger projects aimed at electrifying larger regions of Bhutan and addressing transnational energy needs.

=== Alternative energy ===
In the face of climate change and growing energy demands, Bhutan has sought additional energy security through developing its alternative energy sources.

==== Solar energy ====
As of 2015 there are approximately 4,600 solar power systems operating in Bhutan, with 2,750 on-grid systems and 1,848 off-grid systems. The development potential is estimated at 12,000 megawatts.

Solar energy in Bhutan has received direct investment from domestic and international sources. In 2010, Asian Development Bank provided a grant of over USD21 million for electrification of rural homes, aiming to provide power both on-grid and off-grid. The Bhutan Power Corporation provided solar electrification training for villagers from rural eastern areas of Bumthang, Lhuentse, Mongar, Pemagatshel, Samdrup Jongkhar, Sarpang, and Wangdue Phodrang Districts Solar powered lighting is also available to many nomads living within protected areas of Bhutan.

==== Biomass and biogas ====
In order to shift household dependence on firewood, Bhutan began re-exploring biogas development from cow dung. This included a five-year trial program in Chukha, Samtse, Sarpang, and Tsirang Districts from 2011 to 2015. Bhutan had previously explored generating biogas in an identical fashion in the 1980s, but the program was abandoned after failures in training of masons and users, after-sales service, and site follow-up.

==== Wind energy ====
The theoretical development potential for wind power in Bhutan is an estimated 761 megawatts. Potential is highest at Wangdue Phodrang at 141.7 megawatts and Chukha at 91.8 megawatts.

In 2010, pilot wind turbine programs were implemented to investigate the feasibility of using wind energy to alleviate hydropower drops during the dry winter seasons. It is located at Wangdue Phodrang in the western part of Bhutan.

Bhutan launched its first wind turbines in 2016 in Rubesa gewog in Wangdue Phodrang. It consists of two wind turbines with an estimated production capacity of 600 kilowatts.

== History ==
Since the late twentieth century, hydroelectric power has been a very important aspect of Bhutan's economic development as a low-cost energy source supporting more capital-intensive industries, such as forestry, mining, and cement and calcium carbide production. Bhutan's steep mountains, deep gorges, and fast-flowing rivers create abundant hydroelectric potential, which the government began to develop in the early 1960s with India's assistance.

During Bhutan's Third Five-Year Plan, public works, still primarily roads, continued to take a significant share of the Nu475.2 million development budget (17.8 percent). Despite amounts budgeted for planned development, there were additional capital expenditures outside the formal development plan, including road construction and hydroelectric plants.

The Sixth Five Year Plan (1987–92) was the first to allot power generation projects a significant portion of the national budget (13.1 percent). At Nu9.5 billion, the sixth plan was considerably more expensive than its predecessors. The goals included strengthening Bhutan's self-reliance, as it was hoped that Bhutan would begin exploiting markets in neighboring countries with manufacturing, mining, and hydroelectric projects. Faced with rising costs, Bhutan postponed some projects requiring large inputs of capital until the Seventh Development Plan (1992–96), which presented no major changes in overall sectoral development.

The first major expansion of hydroelectric facilities started in 1975 on the Wang Chhu between Thimphu and Phuntsholing. Known as the Chukha Hydel Project, it helped boost the nation's fledgling industrial development. The 336-megawatt Chukha Hydropower Station came on line in 1986 and was synchronized with the Indian grid that same year, and additional capacity became available in 1988. The Nu2.44 billion Chukha project was 60 percent paid for by India and budgeted outside the normal development plan process. It was planned that Bhutan would sell at low cost all excess power to West Bengal. At the same cost, Bhutan also hoped to reimport some of that power through the Indian power grid into southern districts. The Chukha project was important not only because it supplied electric power to western and southern districts but also because it provided a major source of income for the government. In 1981 Bhutan generated 22 million kilowatt-hours of energy from hydroelectric sources. The project's gross annual income was projected at Nu380 million in 1989. Another major plant in southwest Bhutan — the 18,000-kilowatt Jaldhaka hydroelectric plant — furnished electricity locally and exported the balance to India's West Bengal. In 1989 nearly 95 percent of Bhutan's government-installed power generation — a total of 355 megawatts — was supplied by Chukha, and a total of some 20 principal towns and 170 villages had been electrified. By 1990 Thimphu's commercial district had an underground cable system for its power supply.

By 1991, besides the Chukha project, government installations included seven mini hydroelectric plants, each averaging 7,350 kilowatt capacity; 12 micro hydroelectric plants, each averaging 340 kilowatts capacity; and 8 diesel-powered generation stations, each averaging 6,000 kilowatts capacity. Because domestic consumption was low (just over 16 megawatts, more than 80 percent of which was consumed by industry), ample power was exported to India. The project not only halved domestic electricity costs, but also generated revenues from electricity sold to India nearly equal to the total government revenue from all domestic sources. Smaller enterprises, such as the 1.5-megawatt Gyetsha Mini-Hydel, which was inaugurated in 1989, brought badly needed power to Bumthang. Another major plant, a proposed 60-megawatt plant at Kurichu in eastern Bhutan, was included in the Sixth Development Plan (1987–92).

Other sources of energy included biogas, used in some districts for lighting and cooking and primarily generated from cow dung. Solar energy was used for a variety of purposes, including heating dwellings and greenhouses and lighting hospitals. Despite the potential solar energy that might be produced, Bhutan's mountainous terrain prevents maximum use. The same mountains are funnels for powerful winds, however, providing another viable renewable energy source. High-technology windmills were installed in Wangude Phodrang in 1987 to produce electricity to run irrigation pumps.

Still another source of fuel in the 1980s was firewood. Although Bhutan had greater access to electric power than they had previously, traditional methods of cooking and heating required readily available fuel. In the mid-1980s, Bhutan produced a coal equivalent of 982,000 tons of wood for fuel per year to meet domestic needs. Some 1.3 million tons of coal reserves are located in the country, but recovery was difficult and the quality was poor.

== See also ==
- Economy of Bhutan
- Environmental issues in Bhutan
