= List of rivers of Bhutan =

The following is a list of rivers in Bhutan; all rivers in Bhutan ultimately drain to the Brahmaputra River in India.

== Western Bhutan ==
- Jaldhaka River or Di Chu
- Amo Chhu or Torsa
- Wong Chhu or Raidak

- Ha Chhu
- Paro Chhu
- Thimphu Chhu/Wang Chhu

- Puna Tshang Chhu or Sankosh River

- Pho Chhu
- Mo Chhu
- Tang Chuu.

== Eastern Bhutan ==
- Manas River

- Mangde Chhu or Tongsa
- Bumthang River or Murchangphy Chhu
- Drangme Chhu (sometimes considered part of the Manas River)

- Kuru Chhu or Lhobrak
- Kulong Chhu
- Womina Chhu
- Tawang Chhu or Gamri

- Pagladiya River

- Puthimari Nadi
- Dhansiri Nadi
