= Ha Chhu =

Coordinates: 27°14′N 89°30′E

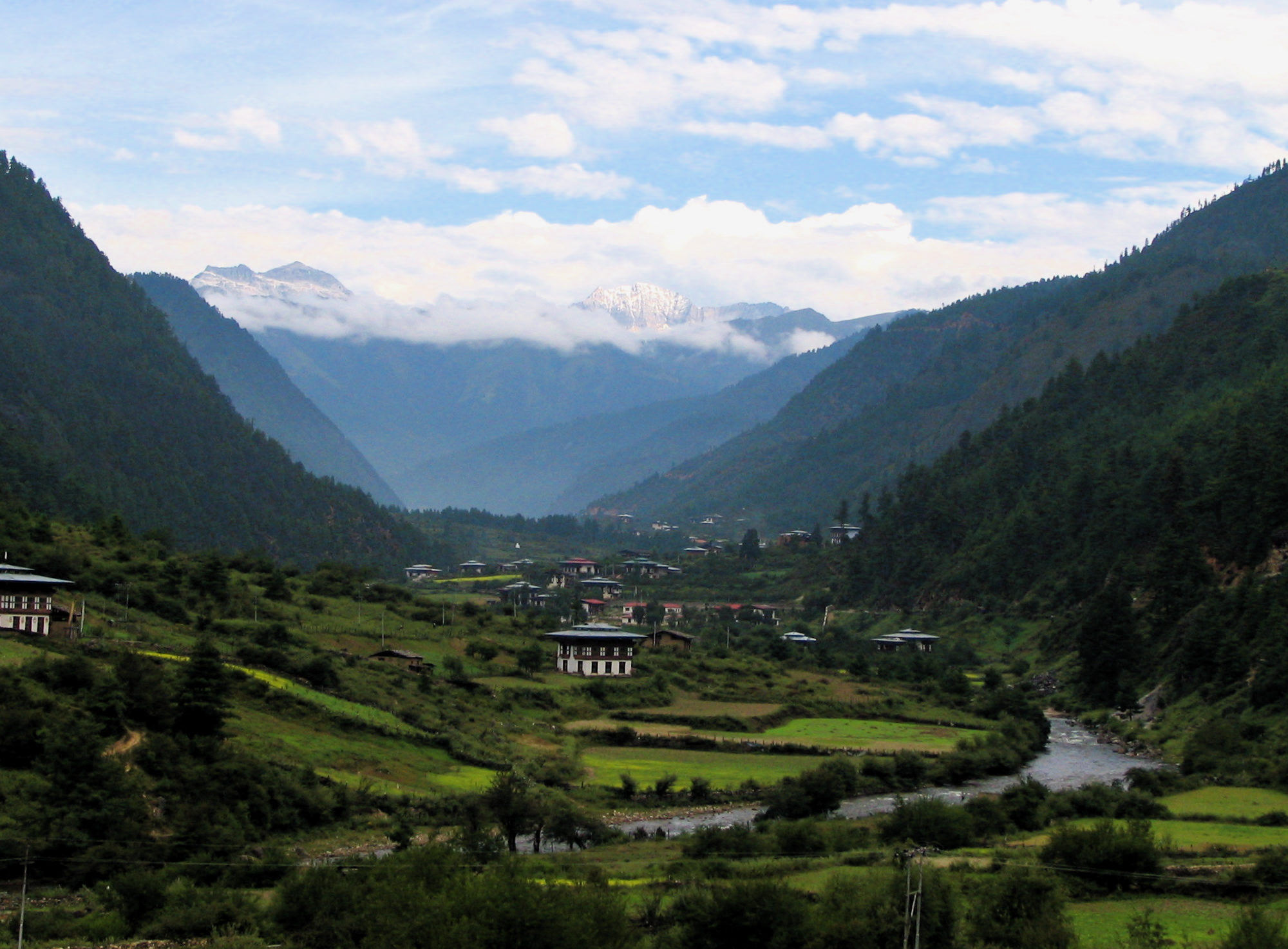
- Ha Valley

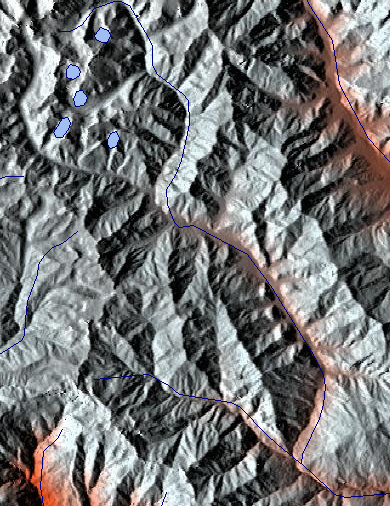
- Relief map showing the passage of the river (centre) flowing towards the south

Location
- Country: Bhutan

Physical characteristics
- Source
  - location: Himalayas
- Mouth
  - location: Chukho

Basin features
- River system: Wong Chhu

The Ha Chhu (also spelled Haa Chhu) is a river in west-central Bhutan, it is a tributary of the Raidak River (Wong Chhu).

== Course ==
The Ha Chhu originates in a valley glacier on the south-facing slope of the main Himalayas. The source area is located to the south of Chomo Lhari (Mountain of the Goddess). A number of smaller streams flowing from glaciers in hanging valleys join the main stream. The Ha Chhu then flows in a general south south-easterly direction to join the Wong Chhu at Chukho.

== Ha valley ==
Western Bhutan is basically made up of the valleys of Ha at 2,700 metres (8,900 ft), Paro at 2,200 metres (7,200 ft), and Thimphu at 2,300 metres (7,500 ft).

The upper valley of the Ha Chhu is glaciated but in its lower and middle course it flows along a deep V-shaped valley. There are many rocky outcrops along this river.

The Ha valley is situated on Bhutan’s border with China, 61 kilometres (38 mi) from Paro. One can climb to Chele La (mountain pass) at a height of 3,988 metres (13,084 ft), the highest point on Bhutan’s roads. The mountain pass offers views of the surrounding peaks and the Paro and Ha valleys.

The bulk of the Ha Chhu catchment is under alpine, sub-alpine and temperate mixed coniferous forests.

=== Ha village ===
Ha is a large village that has come up along this river. Situated at a steep drop of the river, it has a fort. It has retained the traditional Bhutanese style of architecture.

=== Lhakhang Karpo ===
Lhakhang Karpo (Temple of the White Dove), located at Dumchoe, 3 kilometres (1.9 mi) south of Ha village, is a monastery believed to have been built in the 8th century by the Tibetan King, Songtsen Goenpo, after he sent two doves (one black and one white) to find a sacred place to build a monastery. Lhakhang Karpo is the main seat of Ha’s guardian deity – Ap Chundu.

=== Fish culture ===
Traditionally salmonidae (Salmo trutta) and Dinnawah snowtrout (Schizothorax progastus) was found in the Ha Chhu. Brown trout (Salmo trutta fario) was first introduced in Bhutan in 1930. A hatchery was established at Ha immediately thereafter and another at Wangchutaba in 1975. The asla is held in high esteem by the Bhutanese and brown trout seems to be feeding on and suppressing indigenous cold-water fish such as the asla. In 1987, the FAO fact finding and project idea formulating mission for small-scale cold-water fisheries visited Bhutan. A subsequent visit by experts established that the Ha hatchery was more conducive to fish culture than that in the foothill ponds.
