= National Museum of Bhutan =

Museum in Paro, Bhutan

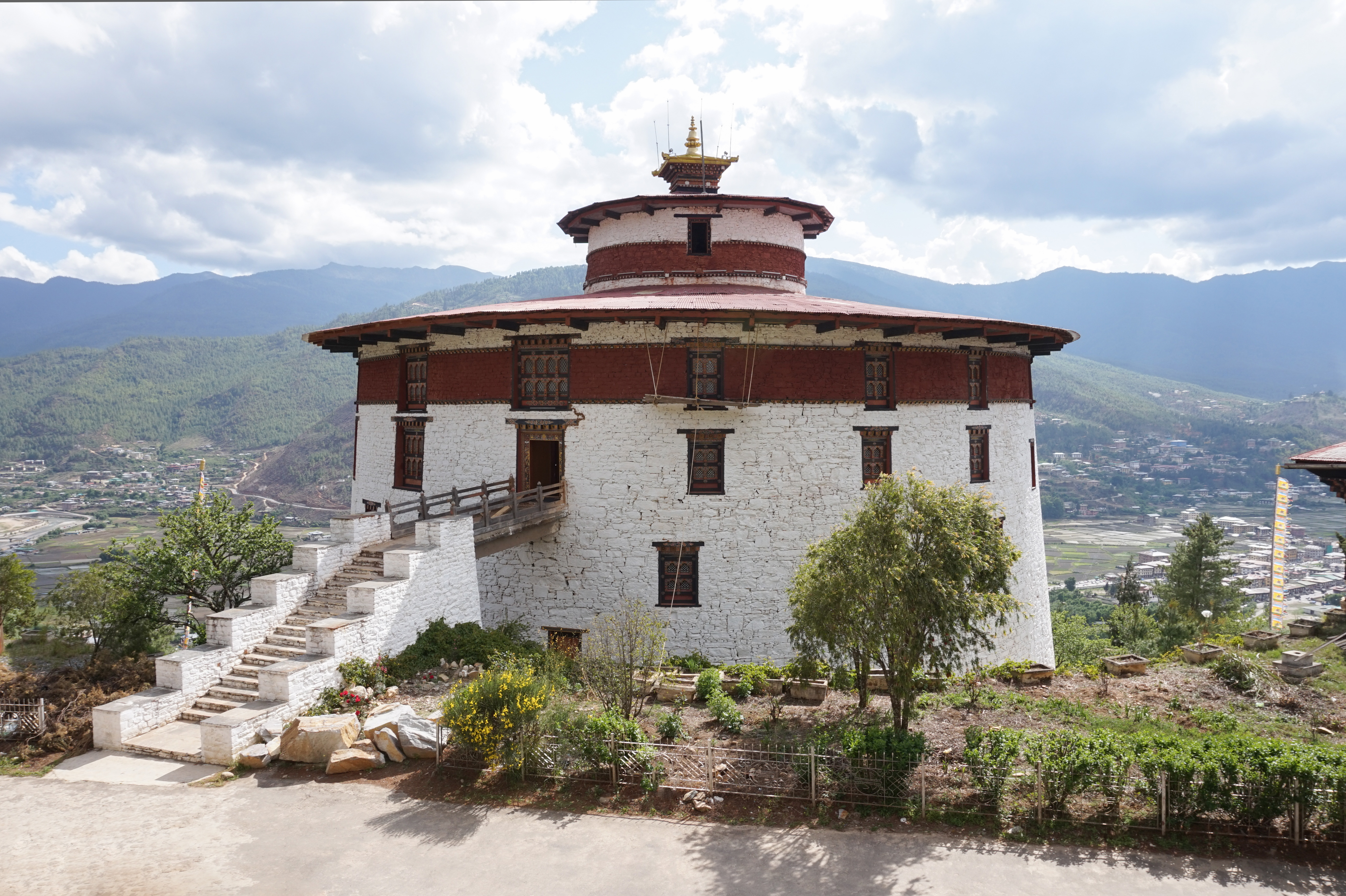
- Established: 1968
- Location: Paro, Bhutan
- Coordinates: 27.42873°N 89.42556°E
- Collection size: 3000
- Owner: Government of Bhutan
- Parking: Yes
- Website: https://www.nationalmuseum.gov.bt/

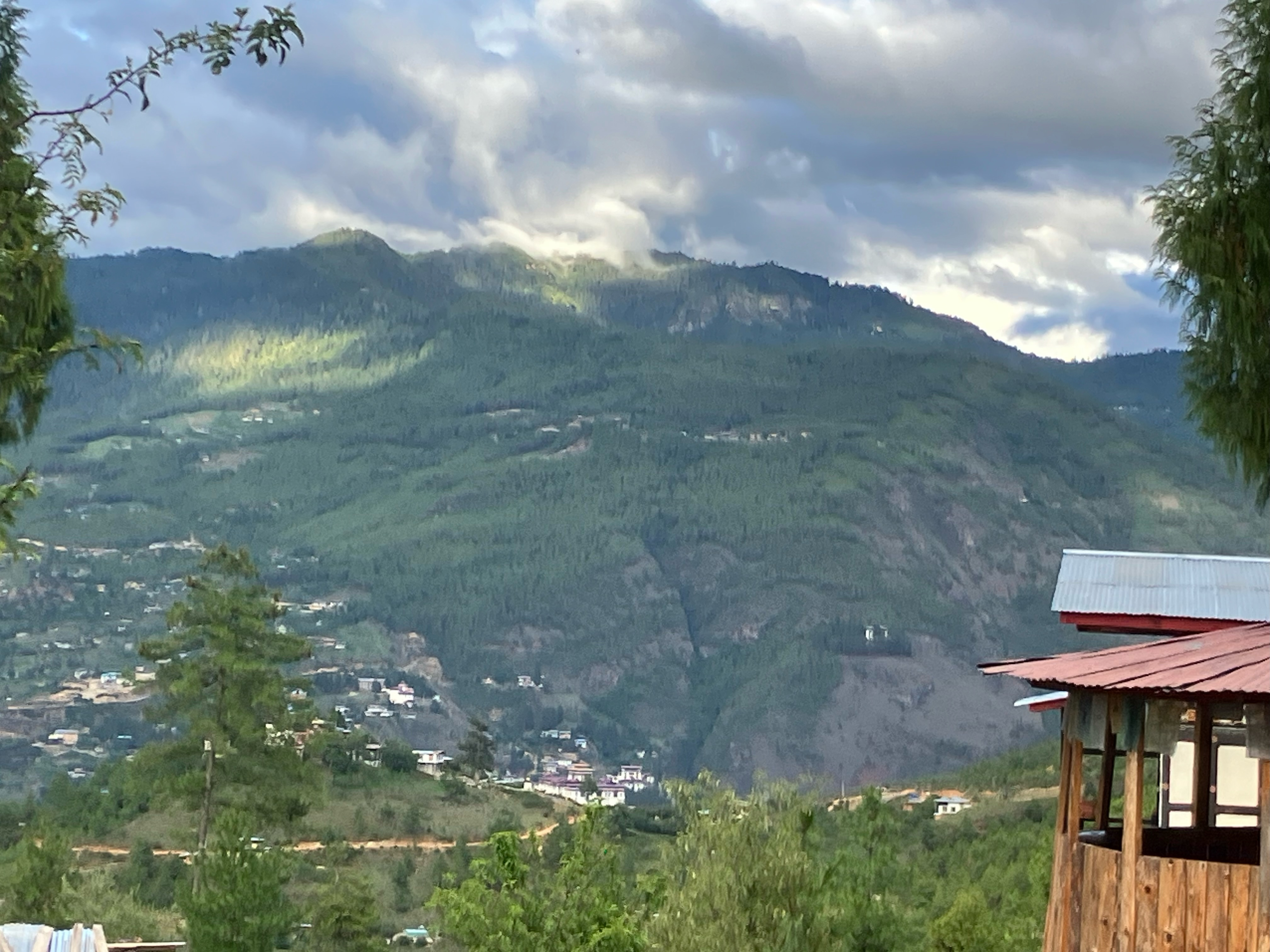
view of Ta Dzong from Tenchen Choeling Nunnery

National Museum of Bhutan (Dzongkha: ལྟ་རྫོང་།, romanized: lta rdzong) is a cultural museum in the town of Paro in western Bhutan.

== History ==
Established in 1968, in the renovated ancient Ta Dzong building, above Rinpung Dzong under the command of His Majesty, the King Jigme Dorji Wangchuck, the third hereditary Monarch of Bhutan. The necessary infrastructure was created to house some of the finest specimens of Bhutanese art, including masterpieces of bronze statues and paintings. Suitable galleries were constructed to house the extensive collections. Works of art were elegantly displayed on scientific lines.

Today, the National Museum has in its possession over 3,000 works of Bhutanese art, covering more than 1,500 years of Bhutan's cultural heritage. Its rich holdings of various creative traditions and disciplines, represent a remarkable blend of the past with the present and is a major attraction for local and foreign visitors.

The genesis of the museum movement in Bhutan can be traced back to the establishment of monasteries and temples beginning with the construction of Paro Kyichhu Lhakhang and Bumthang Jambay Lhakhang in the 7th century AD by the 33rd Buddhist King of Tibet, Songtsan Gampo.

== Architecture ==
The historic building of Paro Ta Dzong, which houses the National Museum of Bhutan, was built in 1649 by the First governor of Paro Valley, Ponlop Tenzin Drukdra who became the 2nd Druk Desi (Temporal Head of Bhutan) and ruled the country from 1656 to 1658. He was also the half-brother of Zhabdrung Ngawang Namgyel.

Ta Dzong was completed in 1651 and served as an outpost and watch tower for Tibetan invasions.
