= Paro Chhu =

River in western Bhutan

Coordinates: 27°19′N 89°32′E

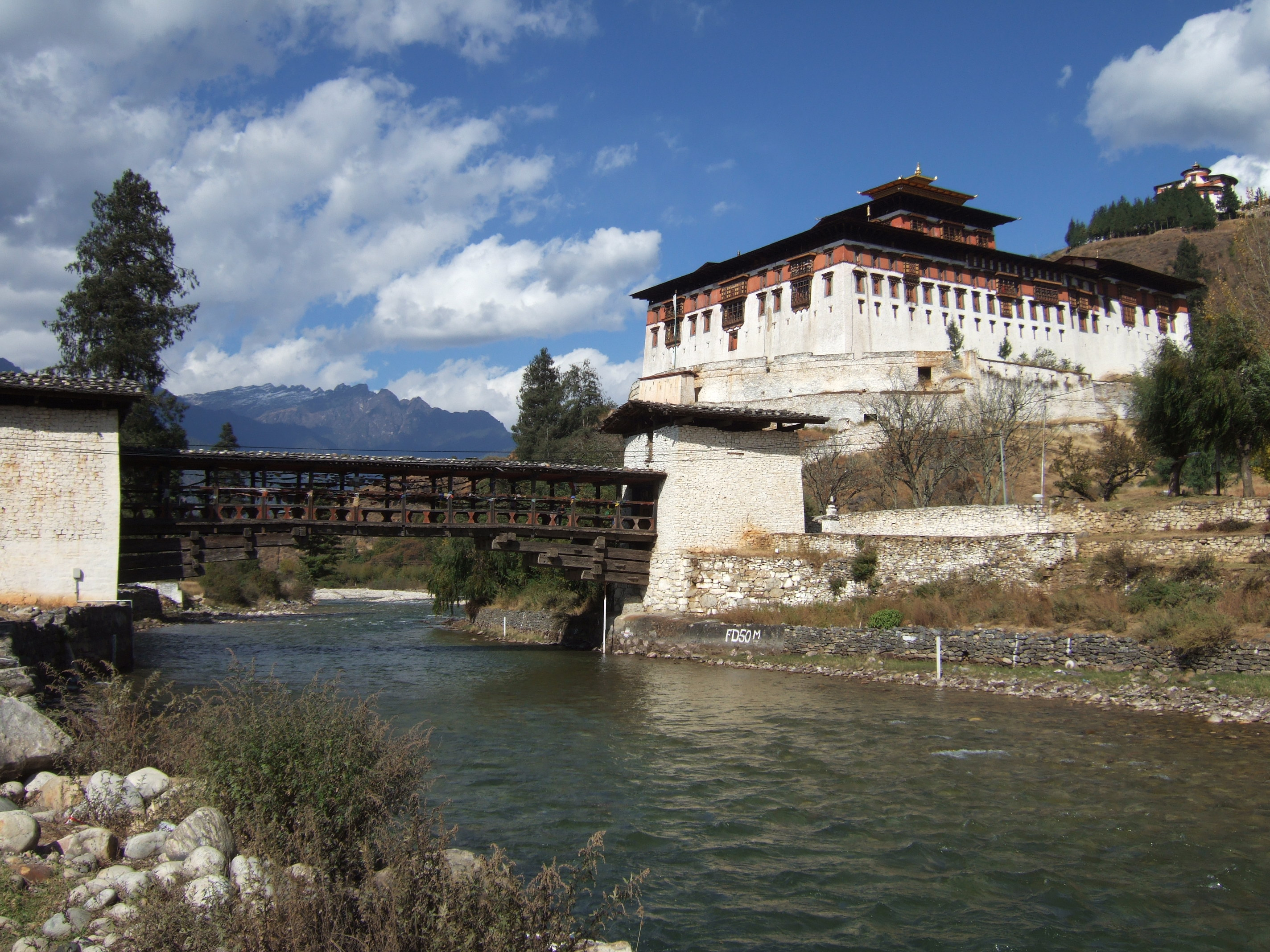
- Paro Chhu flowing past Paro Dzong

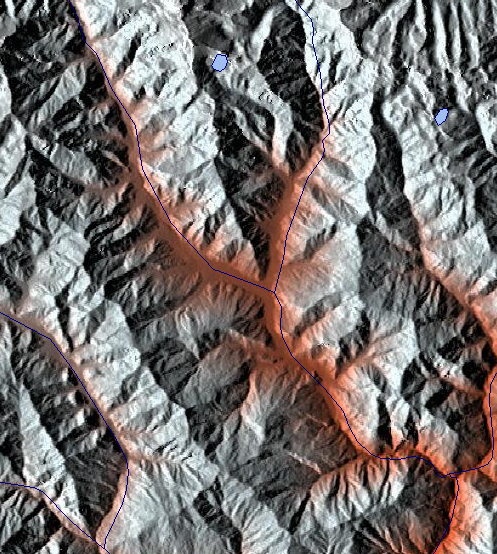
- Relief map showing the passage of the river from the northwest, flowing into Paro (centre) and converging

Location
- Country: Bhutan

Physical characteristics
- Source
  - location: Chomolhari
- Mouth
  - location: Wong Chhu

The Paro Chhu is a river of western Bhutan. It is a tributary of the Wong Chhu, which is known as the Raidak in its lower reaches.

== Course ==
The Paro Chhu rises to the south of Chomo Lhari (mountain of the Goddess). Its glacial waters plunge torrentially through alpine meadows and deep gorges in the Jigme Dorji National Park, and descend into a wide, open, undulating valley. Sub-alpine and temperate forests are found along its middle and lower reaches. A prime trout stream, it nourishes lush green rice fields and apple and peach orchards on its banks.

== Paro ==
The Paro Chhu flows through the Paro Valley, which is the site of one of Bhutan's main towns, Paro, and many important monasteries. The two best known monasteries here are Taktshang ("Tiger's nest" in Dzongkha), and Paro Dzong. Taktshang clings to a ledge of a high cliff approximately 15 km north of Paro. Taktshang and Paro Dzong are two of the finest examples of Bhutanese architecture. Below the Dzong, a traditional wooden covered bridge called Nyamai Zam spans the Paro Chhu. The original bridge was washed away in a flood in 1969 and the present one is a reconstruction. Earlier versions of this bridge were removed to protect the Dzong. The bridge was also shown in the movie Little Buddha by Bernardo Bertolucci Below the town of Paro, the river runs immediately to the west of Bhutan's only international airport. That airport is renowned for its hair-raising final approach.

== Kayaking ==
The lower Paro Chhu is a good stretch of about 7 kilometres (4.3 mi) for beginner/intermediate kayakers. This stretch has many small, boulder rapids and wave trains. There is one class IV–V boulder choke, about 3 km from the put in, which can be run on the left and scouted from the right. It is suitable for kayaks only as the river is too small for a raft to be enjoyable. After this, the river enters a short, scenic canyon with more class II–III rapids. The stretch ends at Chhuzom. More experienced kayakers can continue down the Wong Chhu.

== Chhuzom ==
Chhuzom (Chhu means river and zom means join) is the place where Paro Chhu joins the Wong Chhu. For many traditional Bhutanese this confluence is considered the union of a father and mother river. Paro Chhu represents the father and is sometimes called the Pho Chhu, Wong Chu represents the mother. Because Bhutanese traditions regards such a convergence of rivers as inauspicious, there are three chortens here to ward off evil spells in the area. Each chorten is in a different style—Bhutanese, Tibetan and Nepali. The upper reaches of Wong Chhu, above Chhuzom, are sometimes referred to as Thimphu Chhu.

== Bibliography ==
- Brown, L.; Mayhew, B.; Armington, Stan; Whitecross, R. (2007). Lonely Planet Bhutan. Lonely Planet. ISBN 978-1-74059-529-2.
- Pommaret, Francoise (2006). Bhutan Himalayan Mountains Kingdom (5th ed.). Odyssey Books and Guides.
