= Tala Hydroelectric Power Station =

Hydroelectric power station in Chukha, Bhutan

Tala Dam
- Location within Bhutan
- Official name: Tala Hydroelectric Power Station
- Country: Bhutan
- Location: Chukha District
- Coordinates: 27°02′10.38″N 089°35′43.17″E
- Purpose: Power
- Status: Operational
- Construction began: 1997
- Opening date: 2007

Dam and spillways
- Type of dam: Gravity
- Impounds: Wangchu River
- Height: 92 m (302 ft)
- Length: 128.7 m (422 ft)
- Elevation at crest: 1,366 m (4,482 ft)
- Dam volume: 3,520,000 m^{3} (4,600,000 cu yd)

Reservoir
- Total capacity: 9,800,000 m^{3} (7,900 acre⋅ft)
- Active capacity: 3,200,000 m^{3} (2,594 acre⋅ft)
- Catchment area: 4,028 km^{2} (1,555 mi^{2})
- Surface area: 360 m^{2} (0.089 acres; 0.036 ha)
- Normal elevation: 1,363 m (4,472 ft)

Power Station
- Commission date: 2006-2007
- Hydraulic head: 860 m (2,820 ft)
- Turbines: 6 x 170 MW (230,000 hp) Pelton-type
- Installed capacity: 1,020 MW (1,370,000 hp)

Tala Hydroelectric Power Station is a run-of-the-river hydroelectric power station on the Wangchu River in Chukha District, Bhutan. The station consists of a 92-metre (302 ft) tall gravity dam which diverts water through a 22 km (14 mi) long headrace tunnel to the power station (26°50′26.36″N 089°35′12.55″E) which contains six 170 MW Pelton turbine-generators. The difference in elevation between the dam and the power station affords the project a hydraulic head of 860 m (2,822 ft).

Preliminary construction on the project began in 1997 and major works were underway by 1999. The power equipments viz. turbines, generators etc. were designed and manufactured by Bharat Heavy Electricals Limited (BHEL), at their various factories in India. The first generator was commissioned on 31 July 2006 and the final on 30 March 2007. The project cost was about US$900 million and was financed by India through grants. All of the electricity generated is exported to India through three 400kV transmission lines.

The power station is the country's biggest hydropower project and the fourth after the Chuka project (336 MW) in 1988, followed by Kurichhu (60 MW) in 2001, and Basochho (40 MW) in 2005. Electricity revenue was expected to provide no less than 60% of the government's entire revenue in 2009. In 2017, 97.7% of Bhutanese households had access to electricity.

== See also ==
- Raidāk River
