= Raidāk River =

River in Bhutan, India and Bangladesh

Coordinates: 26.112°N 89.706°E

Raidāk River/Wang Chhu
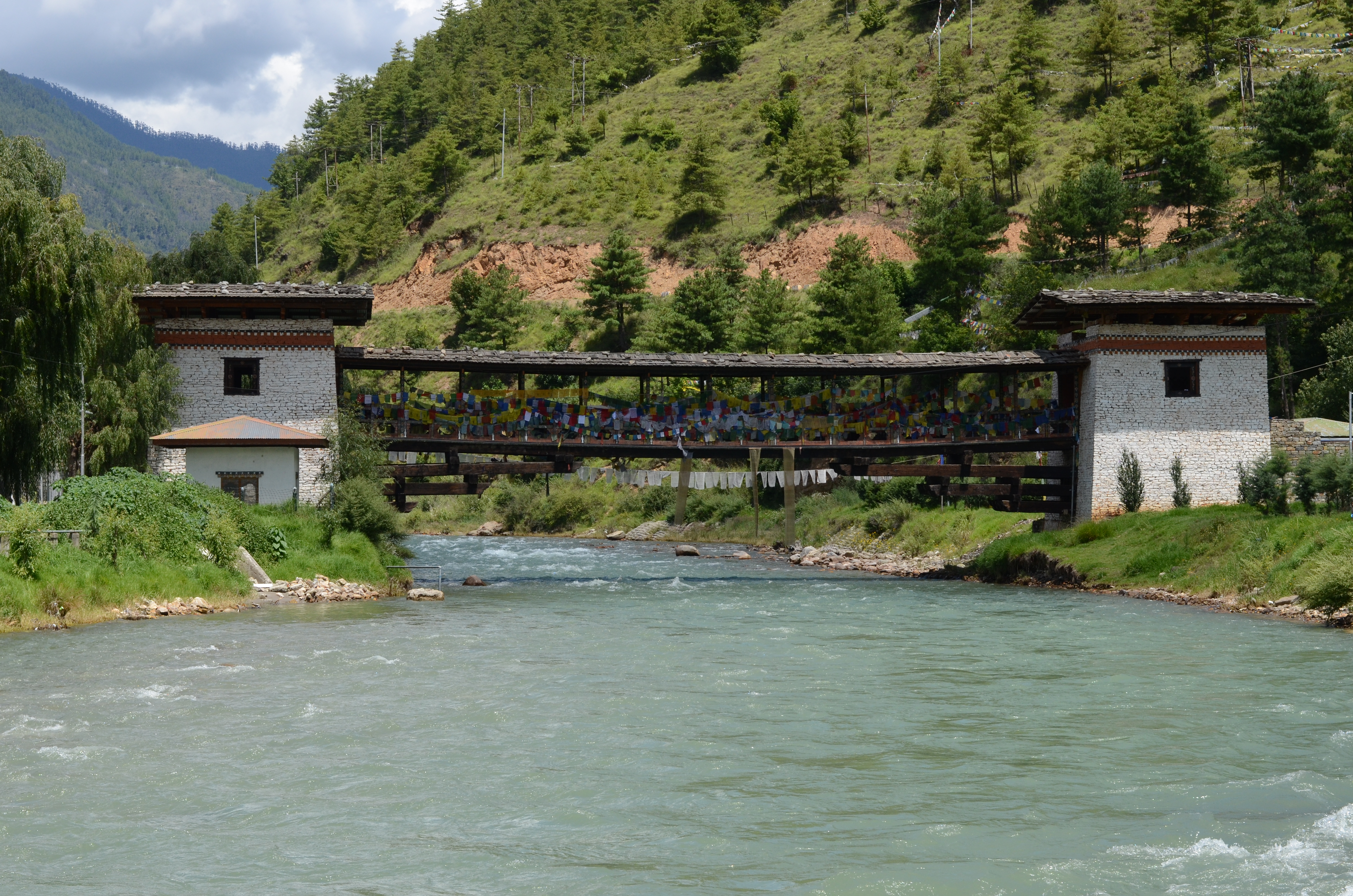

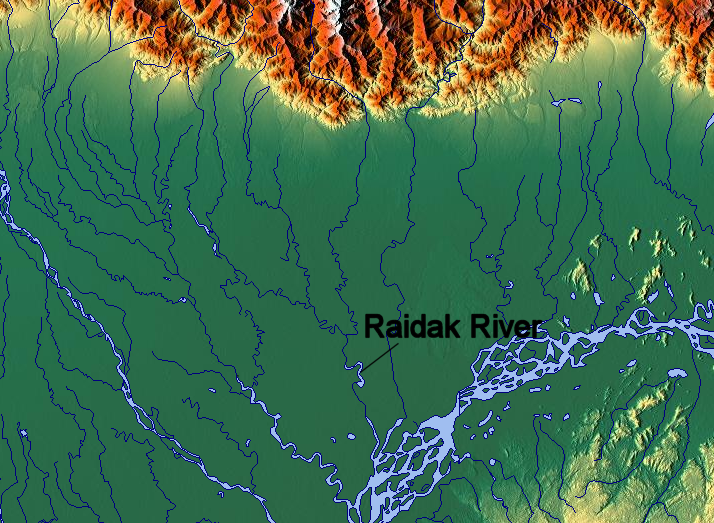
- Relief map showing the passage of the Raidak River into the larger Brahmaputra

Location
- Country: Bhutan; India; Bangladesh

Physical characteristics
- Mouth
  - location: Brahmaputra River
- Length: 370 kilometres (230 mi)

Basin features
- Progression: Thimphu, Rinpung Dzong, Chukha hydel project, Tala hydel project, Tufanganj

The Raidāk River (also called Wang Chhu or Wong Chhu in Bhutan) is a tributary of the Brahmaputra River, and a trans-boundary river. It flows through Bhutan, India and Bangladesh.

== Course ==
=== Bhutan ===
The Wang Chhu, or Raidāk, rises in the Himalayas. In its upper reaches it is also known as the Thimphu Chhu. The main river is a rapid stream, running over a bed of large boulders. Between Thimphu and the confluence with the Paro Chhu, the course of the river is not severely confined but, after leaving the confluence, it runs through a narrow defile between very steep cliffs. It subsequently flows southeast through a comparatively open valley, its course strewn with large boulders against which the water foams violently. It is joined by several small tributaries flowing from nearby mountains. Just above Paro Dzong a considerable feeder, the Ta Chhu, joins it from the left. To the west, the Ha Chhu drains into the Wong Chhu. At Tashichho Dzong the bed of the river is about 2,121 metres (6,959 ft) above sea level and at the point of its exit in the Dooars its elevation is only 90 metres (300 ft).

=== West Bengal and Bangladesh ===
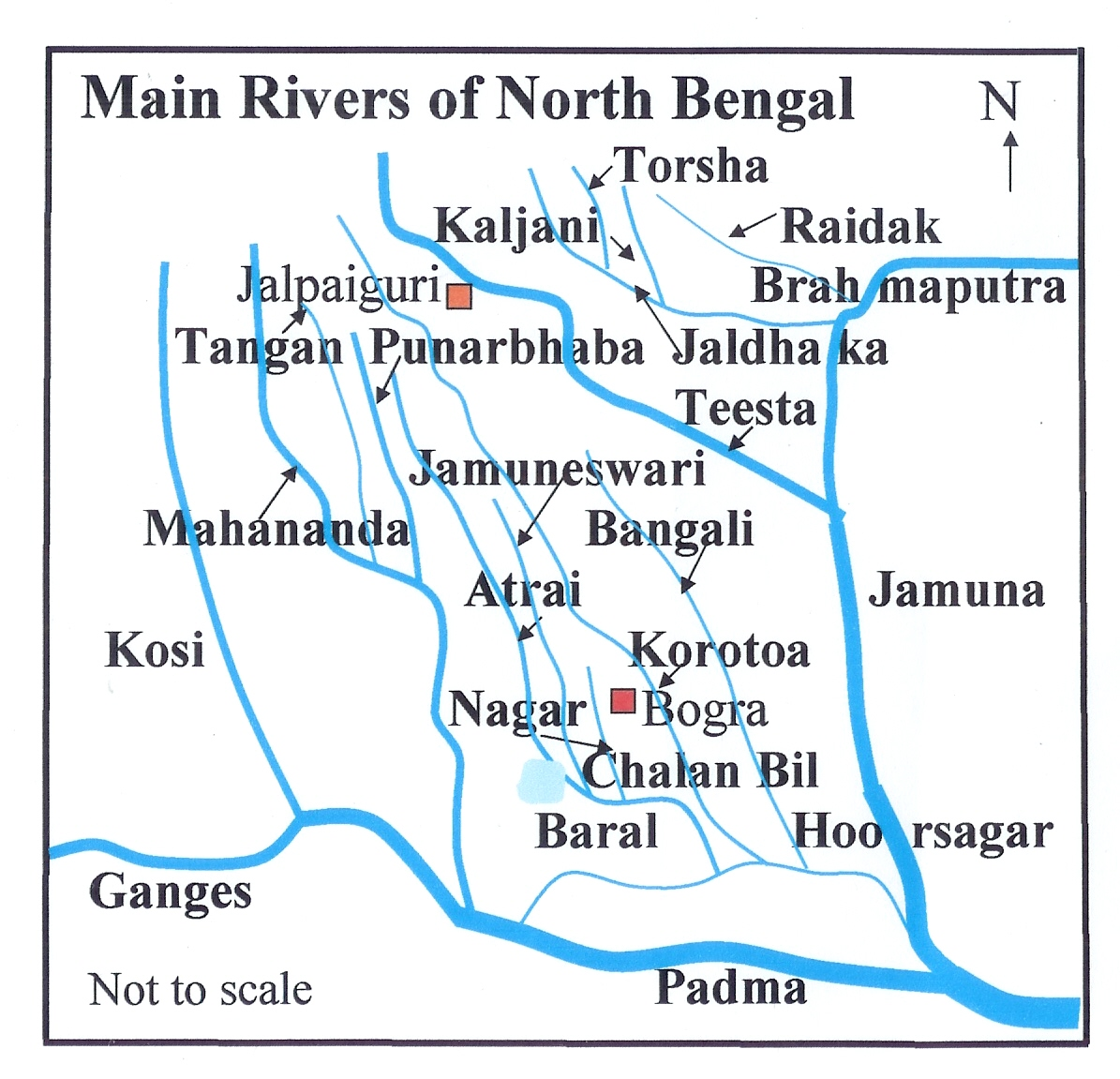
Map of rivers of West Bengal

It debouches into the plains in Jalpaiguri district and then flows through Cooch Behar district in West Bengal. The Raidak confluences with the Brahmaputra at chainage 327 km in Kurigram District in Bangladesh, where it is sometimes referred to Dudhkumar River.

The total length of the main river is 370 kilometres (230 mi) but along with its tributaries, it covers a length of nearly 610 kilometres (380 mi) in Bhutan alone.

== Chukha hydel plant ==
The 336MW Chukha hydel project, which harnesses the waters of the Wang Chhu or Raidak River, was historically one of the largest single investments undertaken in Bhutan, and it represented a major step toward exploiting the country's huge hydroelectric potential. It was built by India on a turnkey basis, with India providing 60% of the capital in a grant and 40% in a loan at highly concessional terms and conditions. In the arrangement, India receives in turn all the electricity generated from the project in excess of Bhutan’s demand at much cheaper prices than India’s generation cost from alternative sources. Located between Thimphu and the Indian border, a 40 metres (130 ft) diversion dam was built at Chimakoti village, 1.6 kilometres (0.99 mi) upstream of the confluence of the Ti Chhu and Wong Chhu rivers. From the dam water was diverted through 6.5-kilometre (4.0 mi) long tunnels to a fall of more than 300 metres (980 ft) to Chukha power house for generation of electricity. Construction started in 1974 and completed in 1986–88.

== Tala hydroelectric plant ==
Tala Hydroelectric Power Station is a run-of-the-river type hydroelectric power station on the Wangchu River in Chukha District, Bhutan. The station consists of a 92-metre (302 ft) tall gravity dam which diverts water through a 22 km (14 mi) long headrace tunnel to the power station, which contains six 170 megawatts (230,000 hp) Pelton turbine-generators. The Tala dam is located about 3 km downstream of Chukha power house.
