= Paro, Bhutan =

Historic valley town in Bhutan

Paro

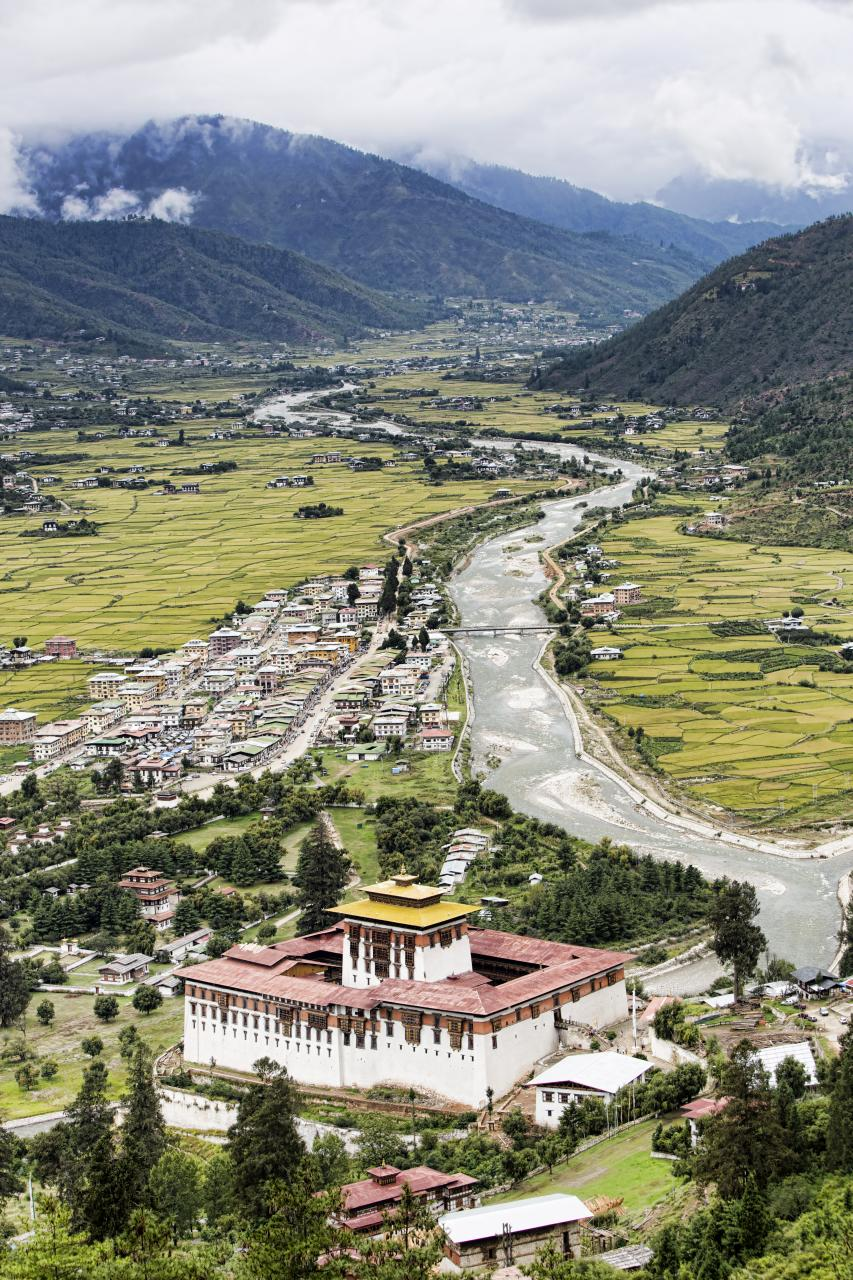
- Aerial view of Paro

- Location in Bhutan
- Coordinates: 27°26′N 89°25′E
- Country: Bhutan
- District: Paro District
- Gewog: Wangchang Gewog
- Thromde: Paro
- Elevation ་ at Paro Airport: 2,200 m (7,200 ft)

Population (2017)
  - Total: 11,448
- Time zone: UTC+6 (BTT)
- Area code: +975-8
- Climate: Cwb

Paro (Dzongkha: སྤ་རོ་) is a town and seat of Paro District, in the Paro Valley of Bhutan. It is a historic town with many sacred sites and historical buildings scattered throughout the area. It is also home to Paro International Airport, Bhutan's sole international airport. Paro Airport is served by Bhutan Airlines and Drukair.

== Architecture ==
The main street has many examples of traditionally decorated buildings.

The Dungtse Lhakhang (a 15th-century temple) and the Ugyen Perli Palace are near the new bridge. Members of royal family lodge in the palace when in Paro. Nearby is the old bridge and the Rinpung Dzong. Notable hotels include the Olathang Hotel built in an ornate style.

About 10 kilometres (6.2 miles) outside Paro is the famous Paro Taktsang (Tiger's Nest) Buddhist monastery and hermitage. Some Bhutanese people believe that Padmasambhava (Guru Rinpoche) flew on the back of a tigress to this location from Tibet. The trek to Tiger's Nest monastery takes about three hours one way. A scenic view of the town of Paro can be seen from the Tiger's Nest. A 16-kilometre (9.9-mile) road passes up the valley to the ruins of another fortress-monastery, Drukyel Dzong, which was partly destroyed by fire in 1951.

Paro is home to Bhutan's tallest building, the Ta-Dzhong, which is 22 meters (72 feet) high, and has 6 floors. It was completed in 1649.

== Airport ==
Paro International Airport has been described as "the most difficult commercial airport in the world", The airport has only one runway. Airplanes on approach pass by 5,500 m (18,044 ft 7 in) Himalayan Mountain peaks, and the 1,980 m (6,496 ft 1 in) runway length presents a double challenge, due to the low air density. As a result, only a handful of airline pilots (24 as of 2023) are certified to operate commercial airplanes there. About 30,000 people arrive at the airport each year.

== Kila Gonpa ==
Kila Gonpa, also known as Kila Dechen Yangtse, the gonpa was founded by Chogyal Norbu, the seventy-generation lineage of Drubthob Chilkarwa, and Tenpa Kuche around the ninth Rabjung. The temple has been a temple for nuns from that time until now.

== Dranggye Gonpa ==
The monastery of Dranggye Gonpa, was founded by Barawapa Gyaltshen Pelzang, a renowned Buddhist master in the 16th century. The monastery is built on the top of a hill, like a drang-gye, so it came to be known as Dranggye Gonpa. It is considered to be the scared place of Tashi Tsheringma, the principal deity of the Five Long-life Sisters. Her other four sisters are said to dwell in Dzongdra kha, Gangten gonpa, Dup Shari and Tengchen Gonpa. During the period of the 9th Rabjung a Tibetan reincarnate, Trulku Gyeltshen Pel, disciple of the Gyalwa Gyaltsen, began his journey from Baeyul in Tibet to Bhutan, following the prophesy of Buddha. He visited various holy places in the country and finally, having reached Paro decided to reside there on the top of the hill.

In 1510, he built Dranggye Goemba and established a small Buddhist school to practice 'Bara Kajyud' teachings. He also built many other monasteries, such as Dzongdrakha lhakhang. After the death of Gyeltshen Pel, the monastery was later seized by lam Kha Nya when they came into power. Trulku Numkha Gyeltshen took over the Lhakhang and his reincarnations continued to reign. When the Zhabdrung Ngawang Namgyel came to Bhutan, they restored the monastery from Lam Kha Nga and commanded the second Drubchen, Jimba Gyeltshen to take charge of it. After the restoration, the Taktsang Lamas were also recruited. Barawa Gyeltshen is one of the Lam Kha Nga. He built a temple of Tencheng Choeling Gatshel Gonpa.

== Sacred sites ==
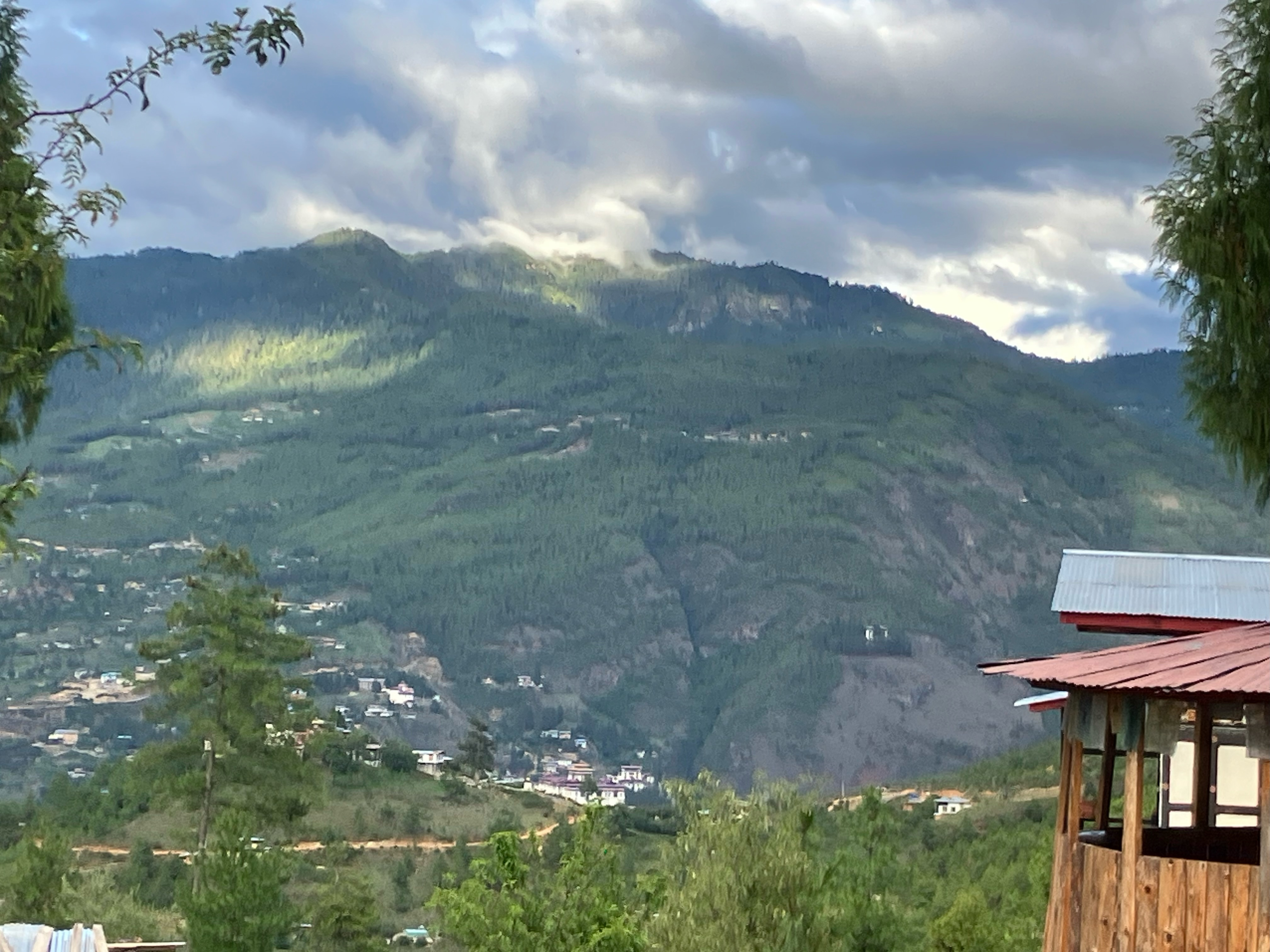
View of Paro from Tenchen Choeling Nunnery

Paro Valley and surrounding areas are home to many sacred sites.

- Taktshang
- Serlung Monastery
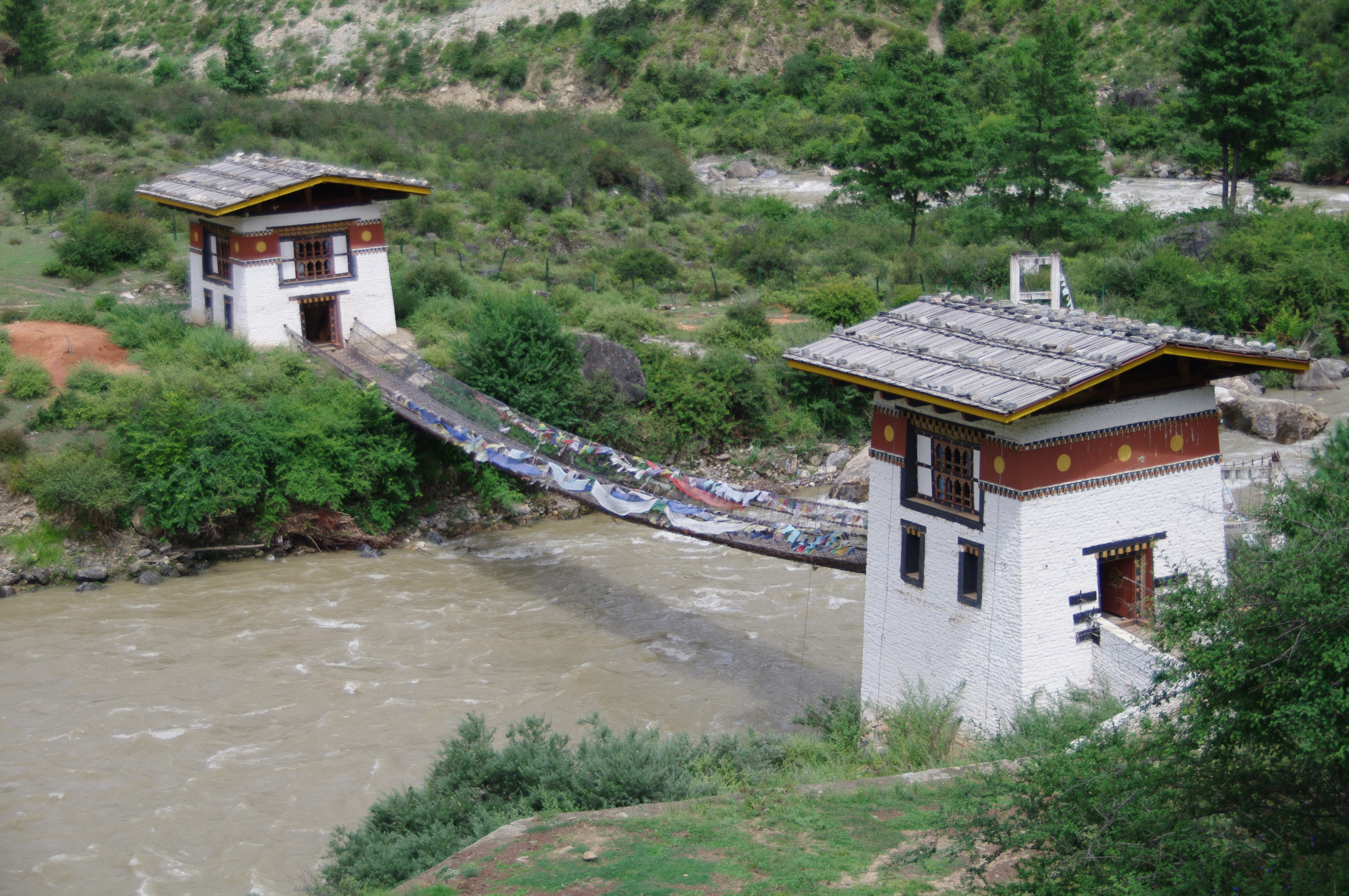
  Tachog Bridge
- Kitchu
- Drugyel
- Paro Dzong
- Sangchoekhor
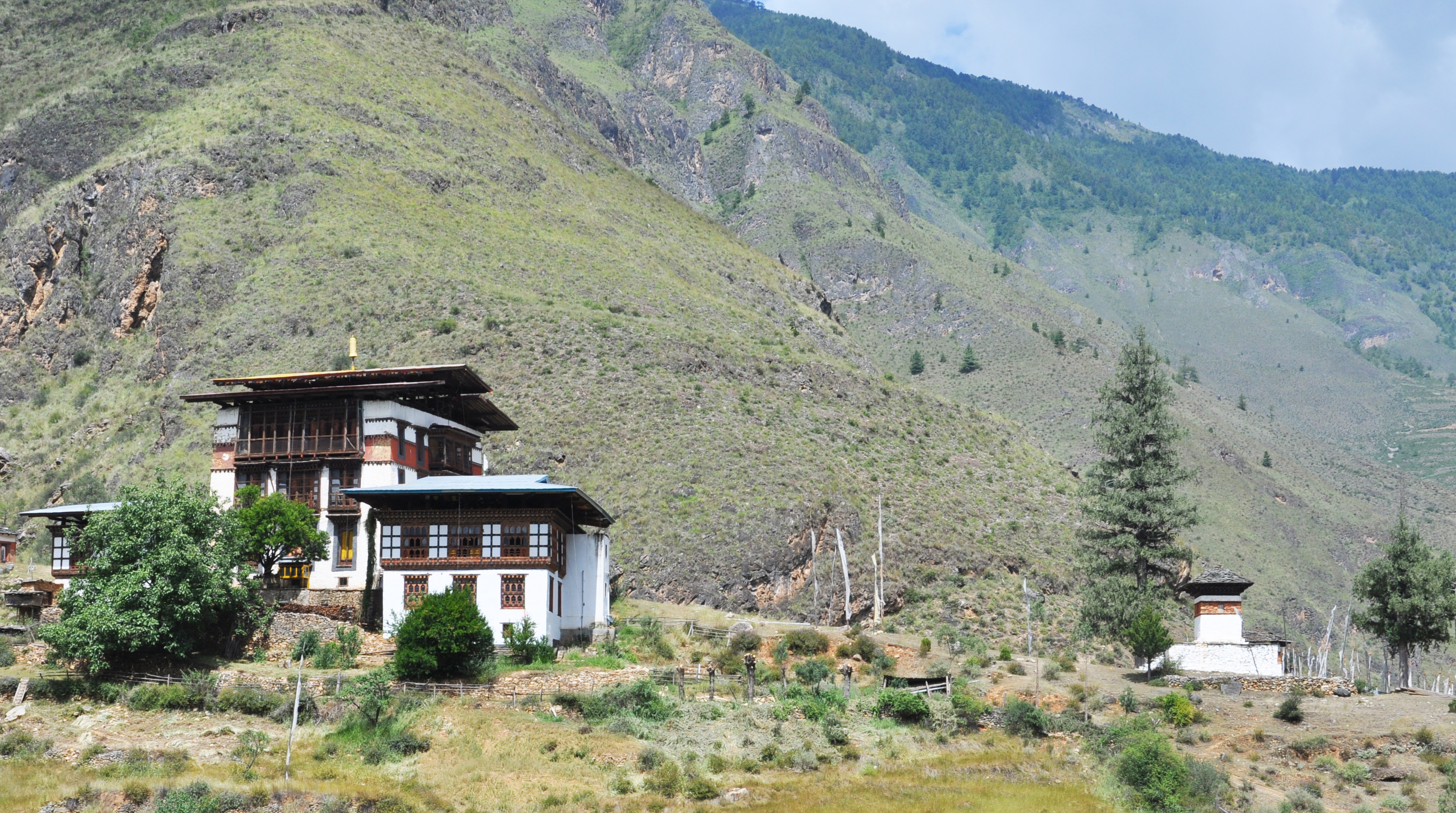
  Tachog Temple
- Tenchen Choeling Nunnery
- Gorana
- Kila Goenpa
- Tsheto Goenpa
- Dzongdra kha
- Bumdra
- Dangkala
- Tara monastery
- Kuenga Choling Goenpa
- Jana Goenpa
- Dobji Dzong
- Yeto Goenpa
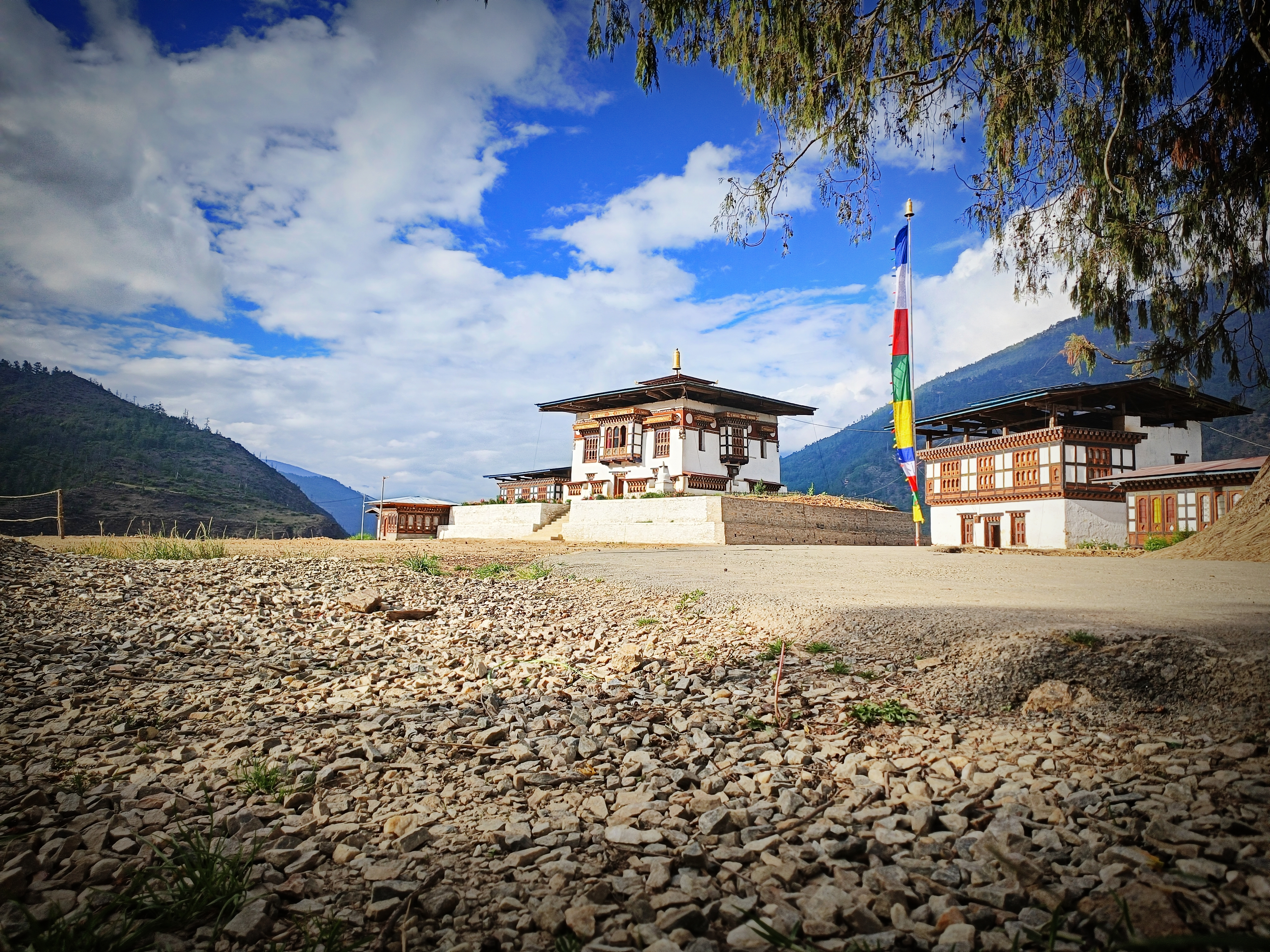
  Serlung goenpa
- Dungtshe Lhakhang
- Mindu Goenpa
- Chungphu
- Lhading
- Zuri Dzong
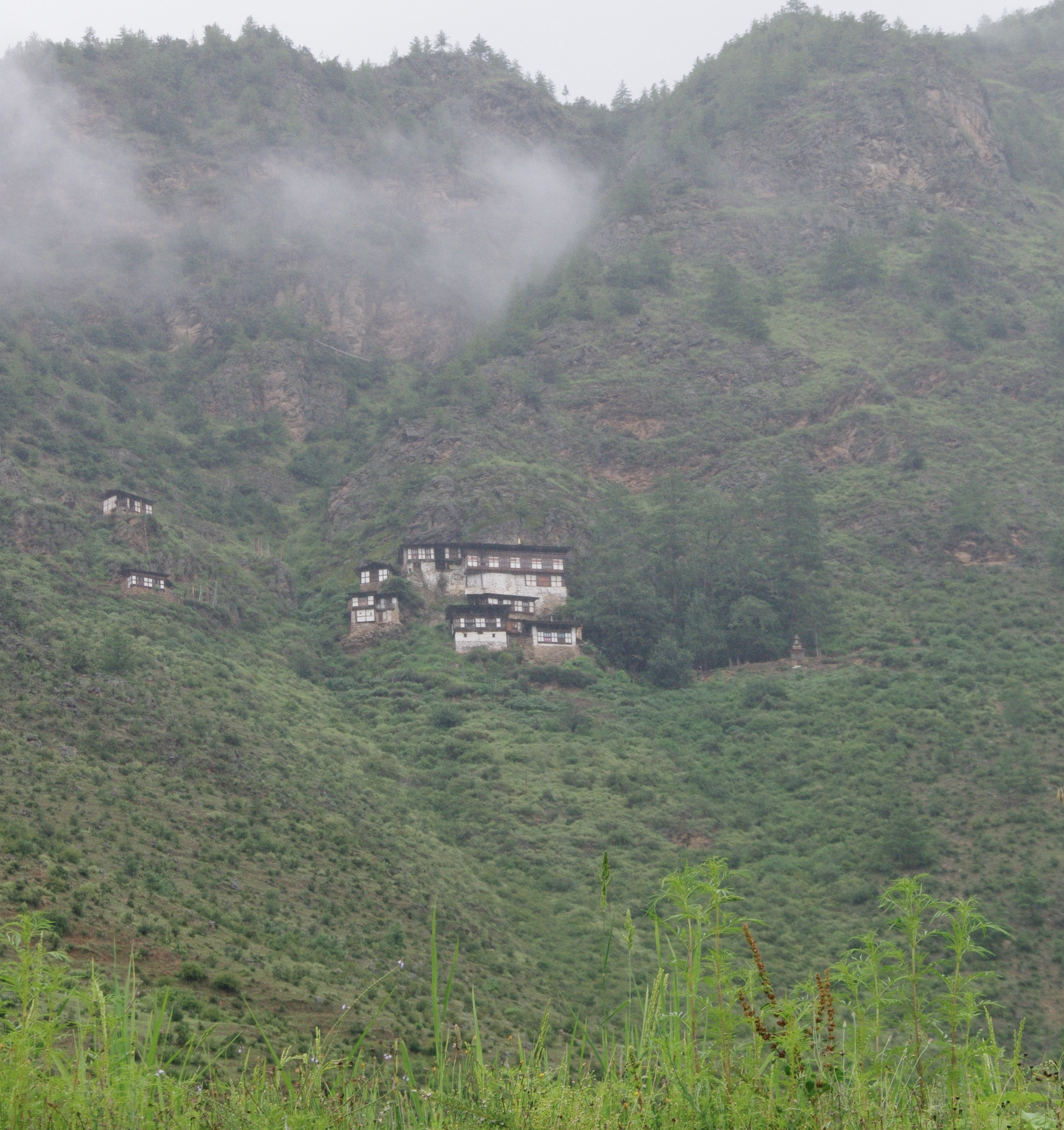
  Gamja loe Goenpa
- Neyphung Goenpa
- TaaDzong
- BumRi
- Jayla
- Karma Goenpa
- Tshamdra Goenpa
- Gantey Palace
- Lemche Goenpa
- Tachog Temple

== Climate ==
Paro features a dry-winter subtropical highland climate (Köppen Cwb)

Climate data for Paro, elevation 2,406 m (7,894 ft), (1996–2017 normals)
Month	Jan	Feb	Mar	Apr	May	Jun	Jul	Aug	Sep	Oct	Nov	Dec	Year
Record high °C (°F)	25.0 (77.0)	24.5 (76.1)	28.0 (82.4)	29.0 (84.2)	31.0 (87.8)	30.0 (86.0)	31.0 (87.8)	32.0 (89.6)	30.0 (86.0)	27.0 (80.6)	26.0 (78.8)	23.0 (73.4)	32.0 (89.6)
Mean daily maximum °C (°F)	13.2 (55.8)	15.0 (59.0)	17.9 (64.2)	20.6 (69.1)	22.7 (72.9)	24.6 (76.3)	25.0 (77.0)	24.9 (76.8)	23.3 (73.9)	20.7 (69.3)	16.9 (62.4)	14.6 (58.3)	20.0 (67.9)
Daily mean °C (°F)	6.2 (43.2)	8.2 (46.8)	11.1 (52.0)	14.2 (57.6)	17.0 (62.6)	19.6 (67.3)	20.6 (69.1)	20.3 (68.5)	18.8 (65.8)	15.0 (59.0)	10.8 (51.4)	7.6 (45.7)	14.1 (57.4)
Mean daily minimum °C (°F)	−0.9 (30.4)	1.3 (34.3)	4.3 (39.7)	7.8 (46.0)	11.2 (52.2)	14.5 (58.1)	16.1 (61.0)	15.7 (60.3)	14.2 (57.6)	9.3 (48.7)	4.7 (40.5)	0.5 (32.9)	8.2 (46.8)
Record low °C (°F)	−9.0 (15.8)	−6.5 (20.3)	−4.0 (24.8)	0.0 (32.0)	2.0 (35.6)	5.8 (42.4)	11.0 (51.8)	10.0 (50.0)	6.0 (42.8)	0.0 (32.0)	−5.0 (23.0)	−9.0 (15.8)	−9.0 (15.8)
Average rainfall mm (inches)	7.1 (0.28)	13.0 (0.51)	22.2 (0.87)	33.8 (1.33)	58.7 (2.31)	80.9 (3.19)	161.2 (6.35)	112.7 (4.44)	87.9 (3.46)	48.8 (1.92)	1.5 (0.06)	2.9 (0.11)	630.7 (24.83)
Average rainy days	0.7	2.1	3.7	6.4	9.7	12.5	18.5	17.4	13.3	4.3	0.2	0.5	89.3
Average relative humidity (%)	69.8	67.7	65.6	66.5	67.6	70.6	77.4	76.7	76.5	70.0	66.7	69.0	70.3
Source 1: National Center for Hydrology and Meteorology
Source 2: World Meteorological Organization (rainy days 1996–2018)

== Gallery ==
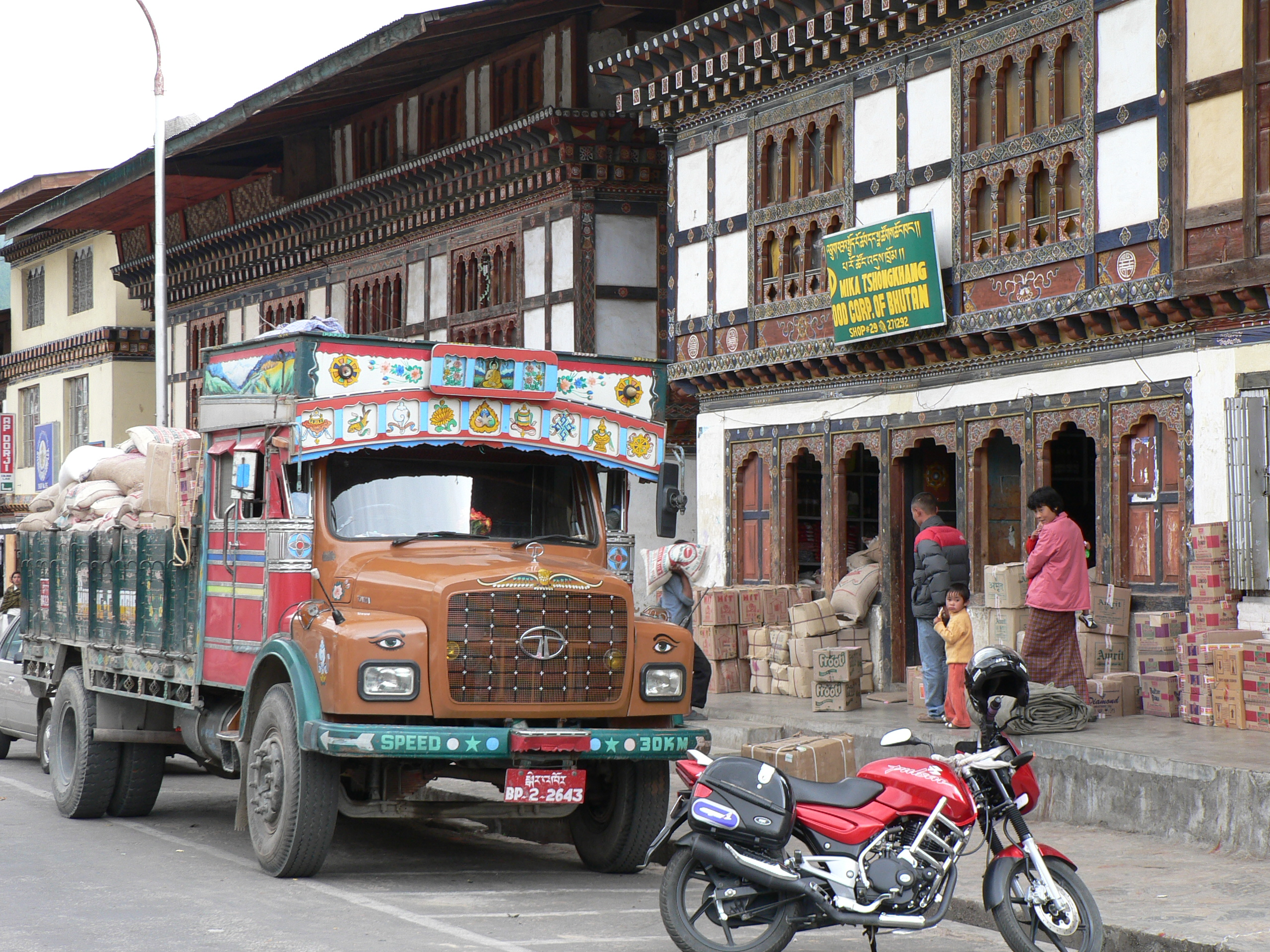
A street in Paro

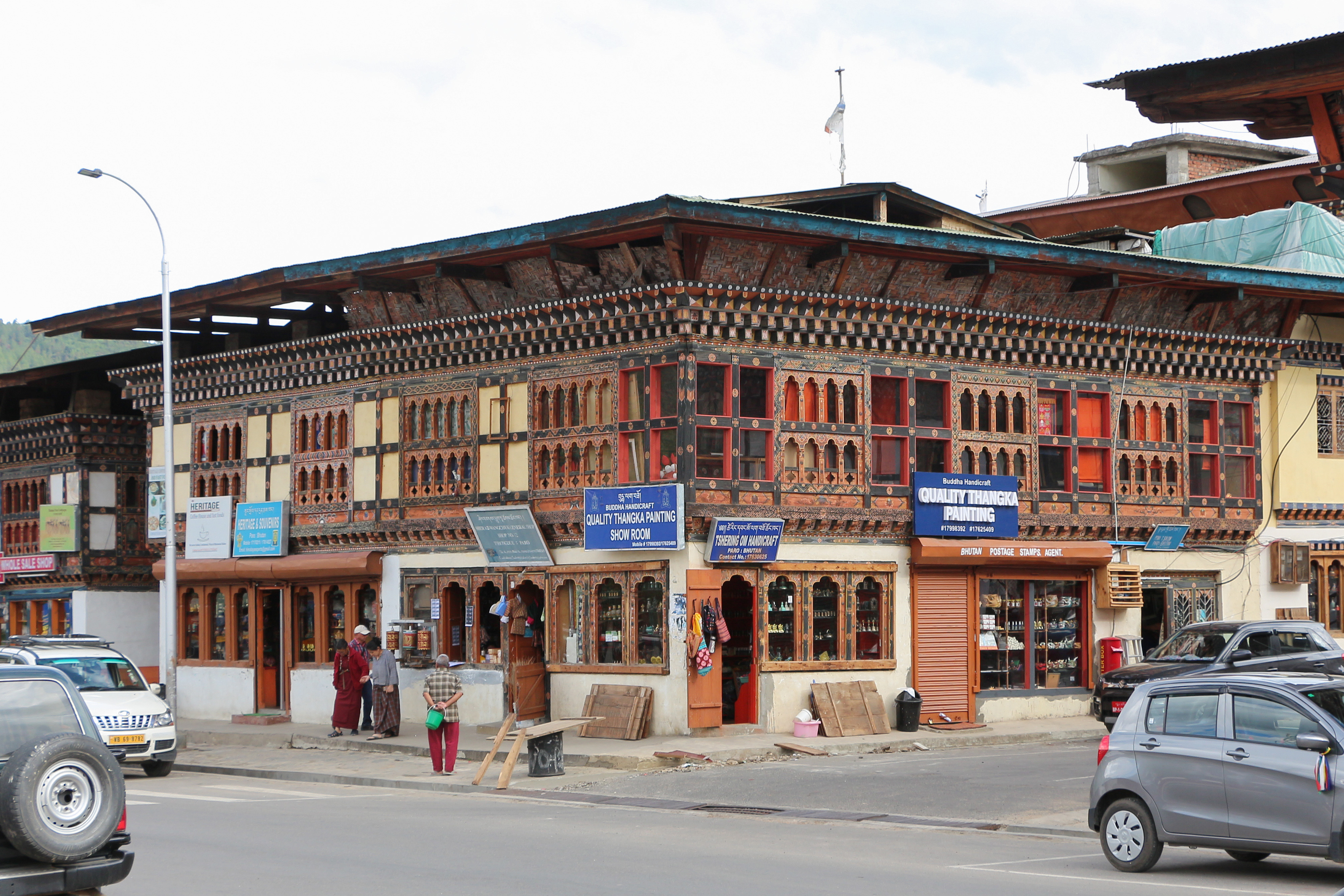
Shops in Paro

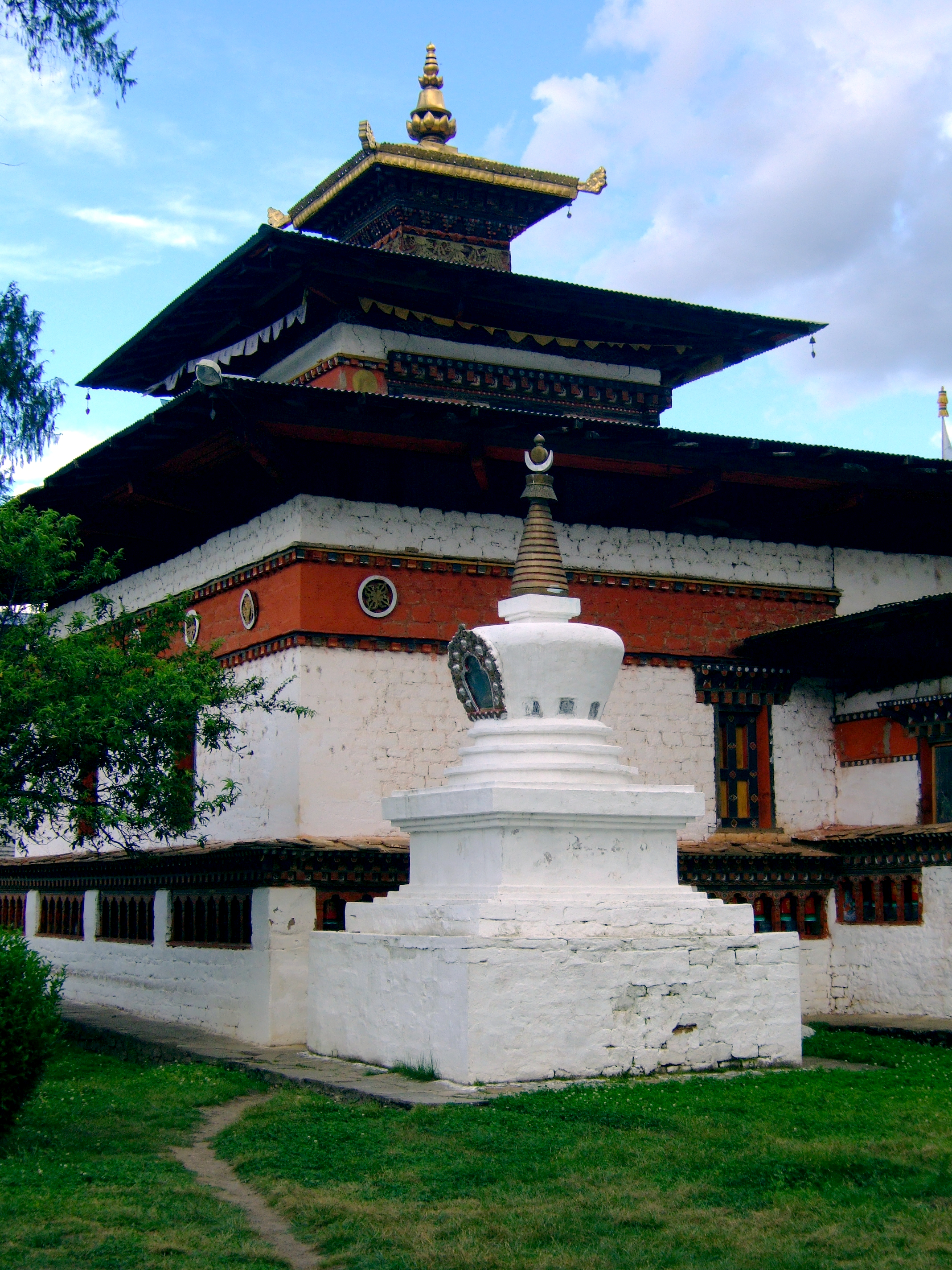
Kyichu Lhakhang

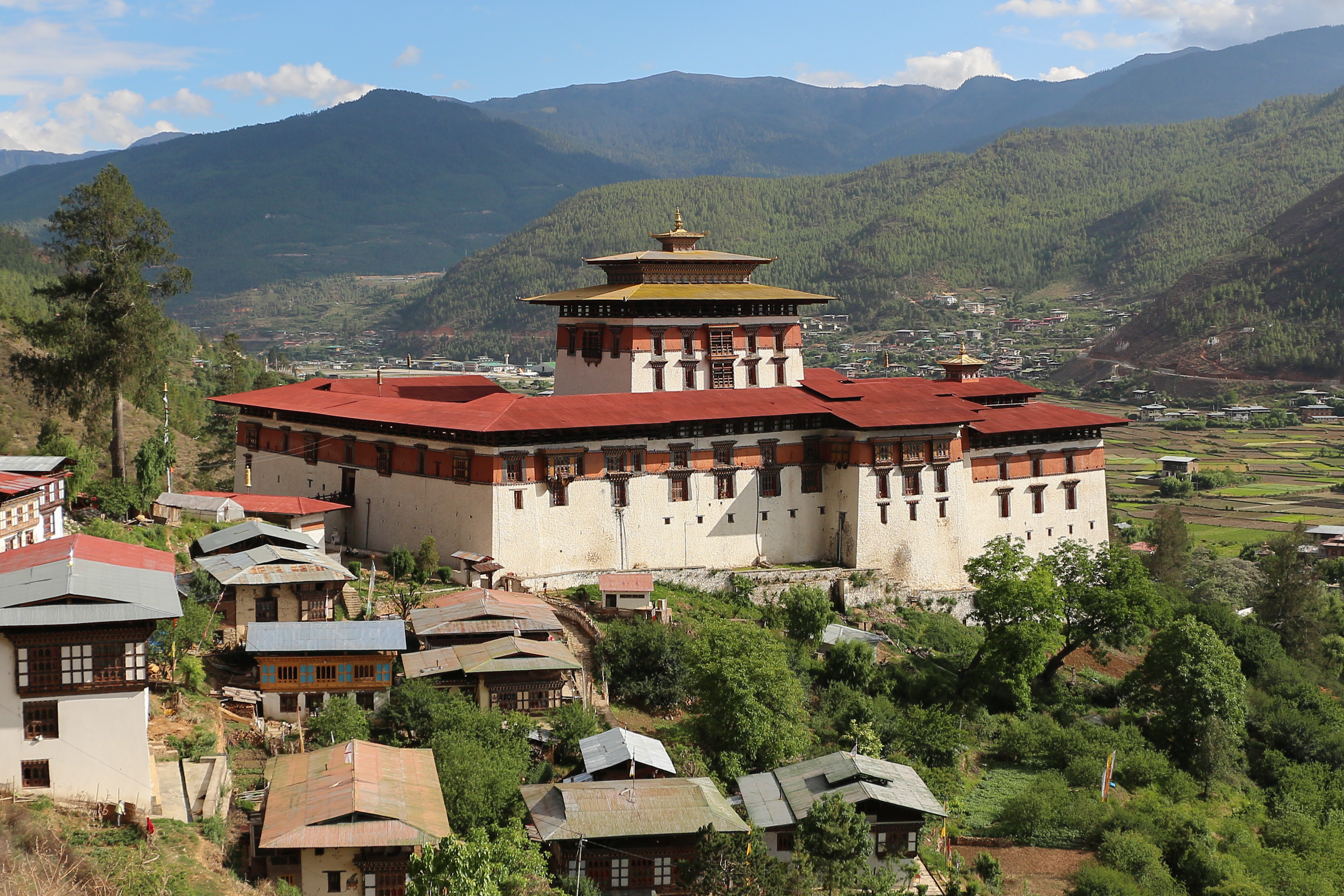
Rinpung Dzong

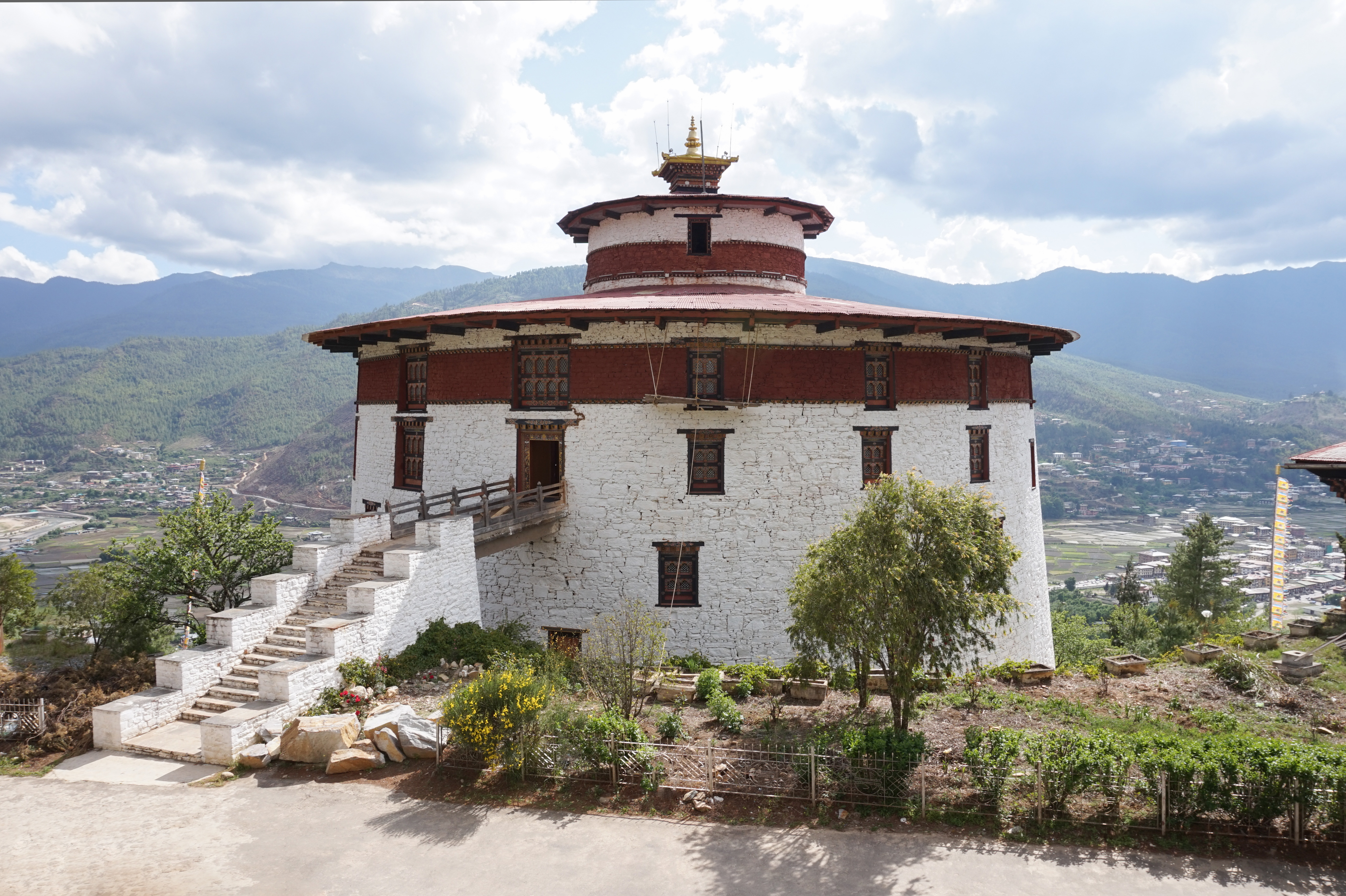
National Museum of Bhutan

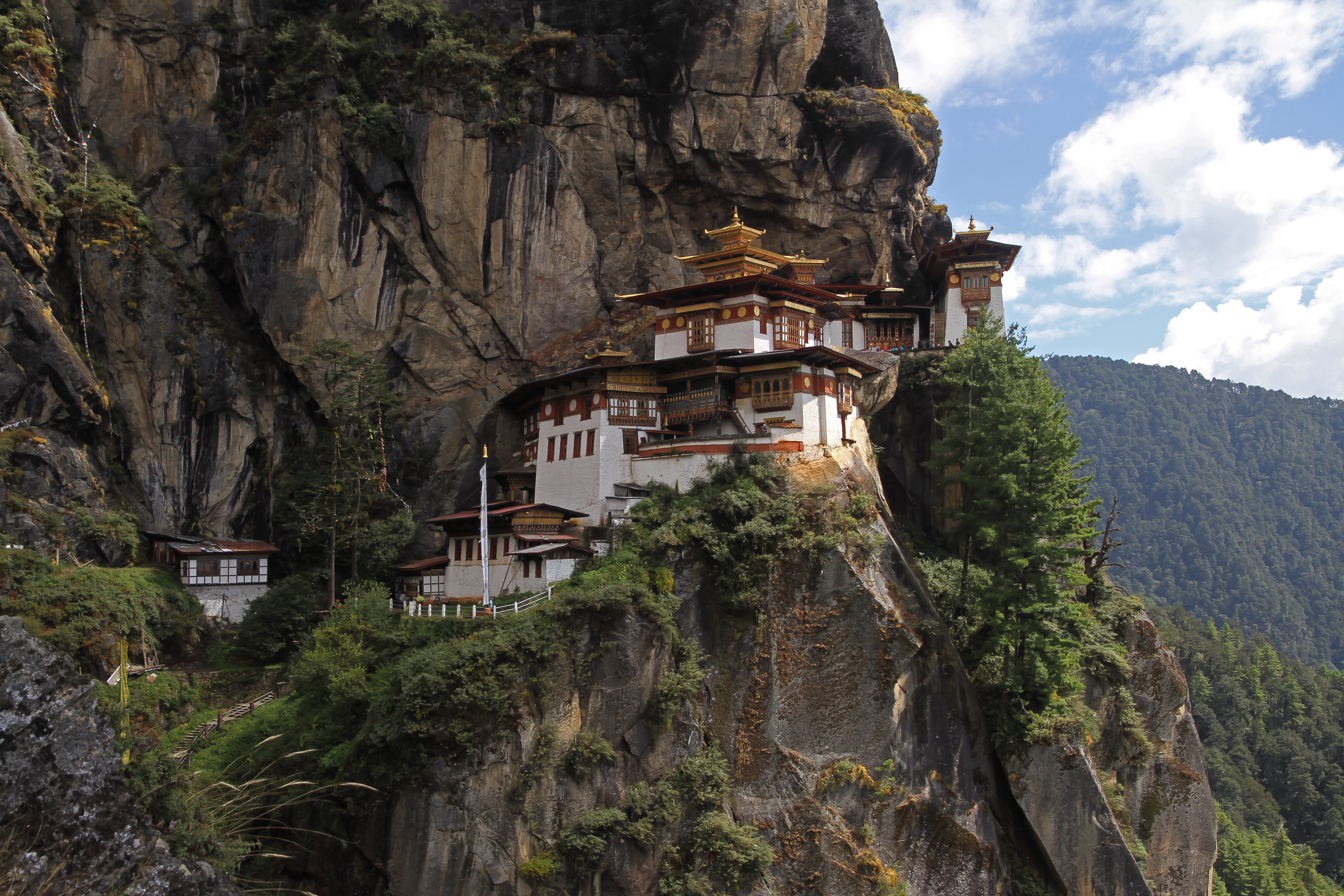
Paro Taktsang

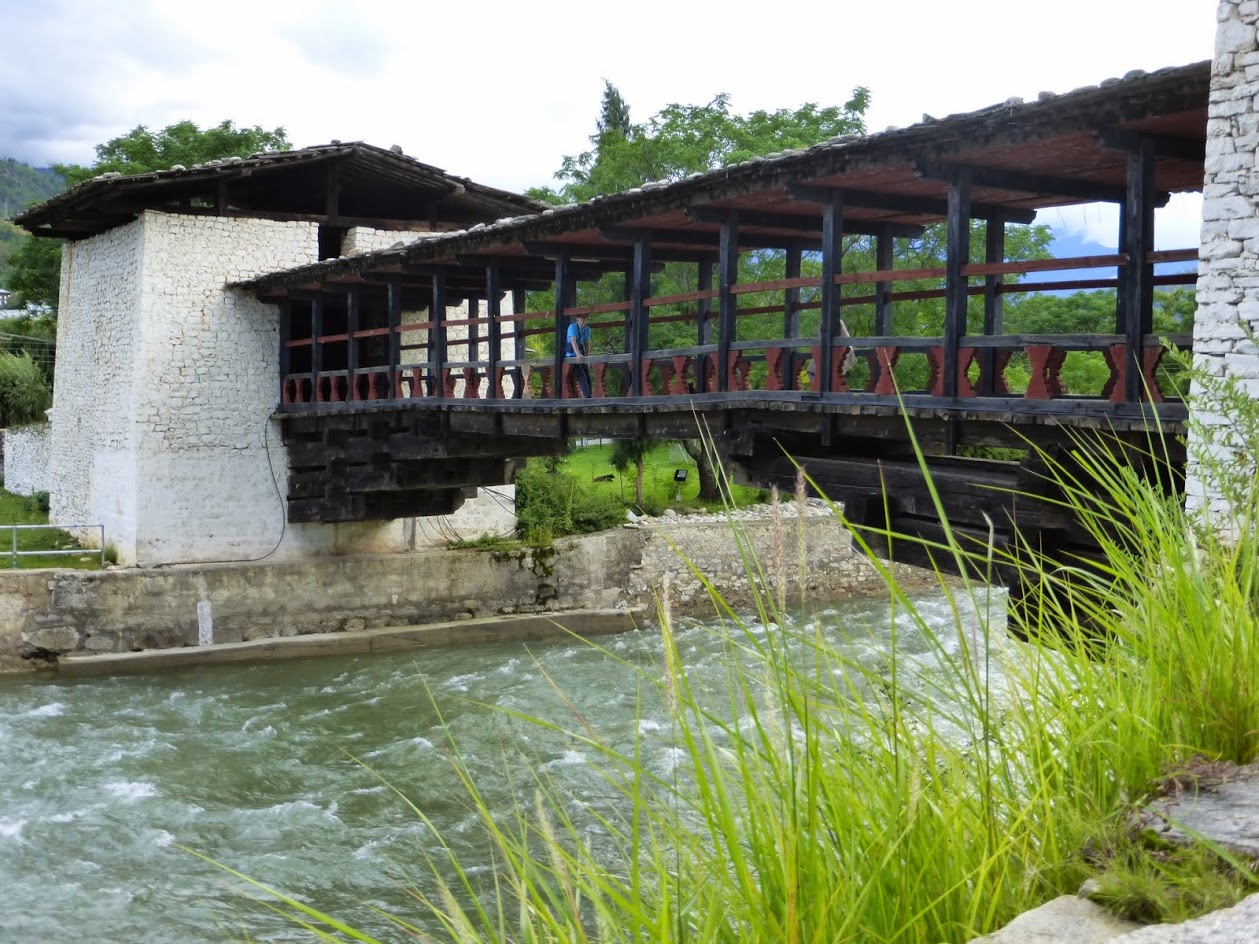
View of Nyamai Zam above Paro Chhu

View of Paro

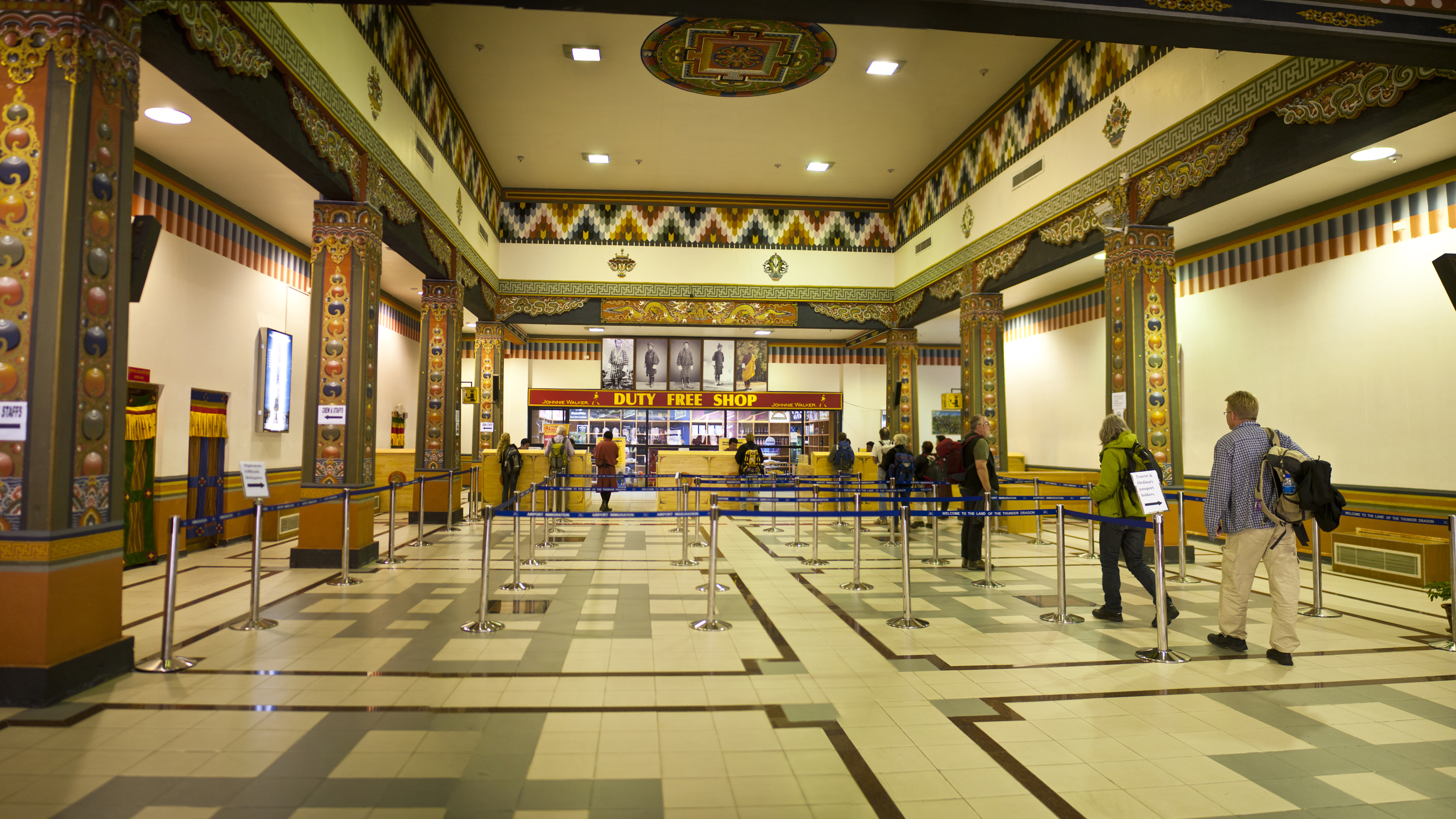
Paro Airport Terminal

== See also ==
- Geography of Bhutan
- Transport in Bhutan
