= Rinpung Dzong =

Fortress in Paro, Bhutan

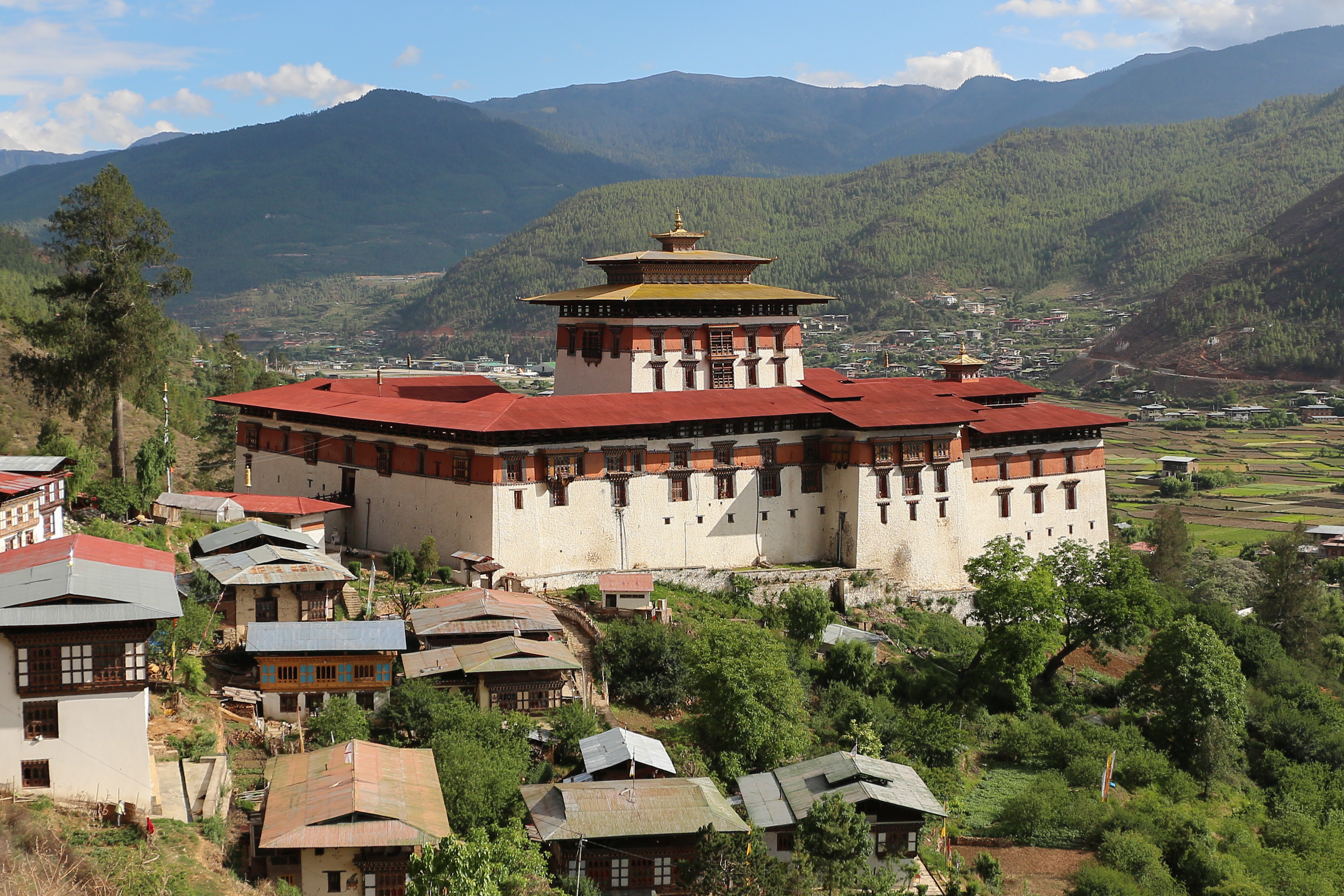
- Rinpung Dzong, Paro.

- Location within Bhutan

Religion
- Affiliation: Tibetan Buddhism
- Sect: Drukpa Lineage of Kagyu
- Festivals: Tsechu, in 2nd lunar month

Location
- Location: Paro, Bhutan
- Interactive map of Rinpung Dzong
- Coordinates: 27°25′36″N 89°25′23.89″E

Architecture
- Style: Dzong
- Founder: Drung Drung Gyal
- Established: 1646; 380 years ago
- Also known as Paro Dzong

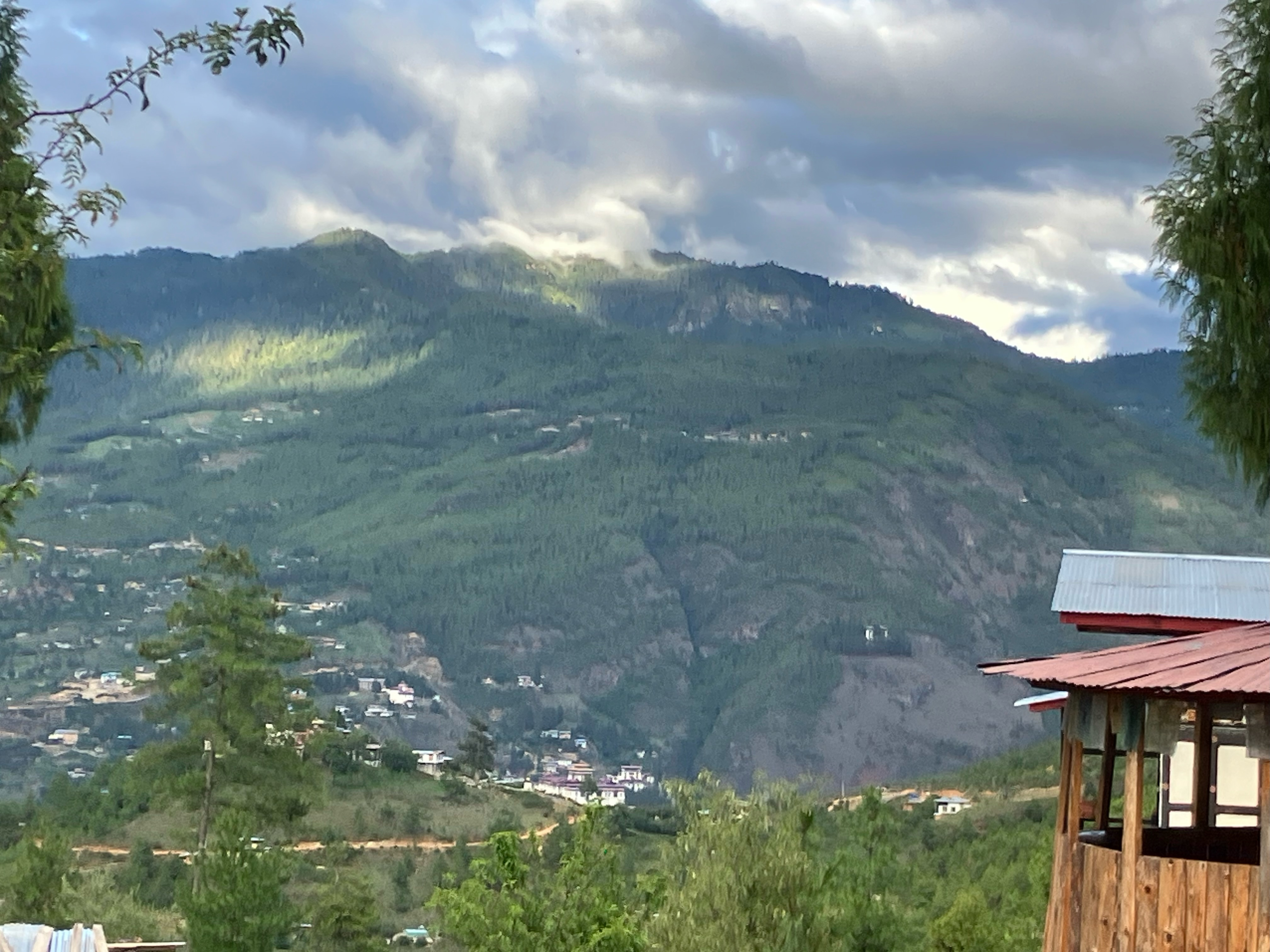
view of Rinpung Dzong from Tenchen Choeling Nunnery

Rinpung Dzong, sometimes referred to as Paro Dzong, is a large dzong - Buddhist monastery and fortress - of the Drukpa Lineage of the Kagyu school in Paro District, Bhutan. It houses the district Monastic Body as well as government administrative offices of Paro Dzongkhag. It is listed as a tentative site in Bhutan's Tentative List for UNESCO inclusion.

== History ==
According to historical accounts of Paro Dzong, the rock face below the site was named Ringpung by Guru Rinpoche in the 8th century. When the dzong was later constructed at this location, it came to be known as Ringpung Dzong.

In the 15th century, the local community offered the crag of Hungrel at Paro to Lama Drung Drung Gyal, a descendant of Phajo Drugom Zhigpo. Drung Drung Gyal constructed a small temple and later a five-storey fortress known as Hungrel Dzong.

By the 17th century, his descendants, known as the Lords of Hungrel, offered this fortress to the Zhabdrung Ngawang Namgyal, founder of the unified Bhutanese state and head of the Drukpa Lineage, in recognition of his religious and political authority. In 1644, the Zhabdrung dismantled the old structure and laid the foundations for a new dzong. The new fortress was consecrated in 1646 and established as the administrative and monastic centre of western Bhutan, thereafter becoming known as Rinpung Dzong.

During the tenure of the 23rd Penlop, Dawa Penjor, the dzong was severely damaged by fire, prior to the enthronement of the first king, Gongsa Ugyen Wangchuck. Most of the relics and statues were destroyed, with the exception of the 20-metre-wide Thongdrel. Devotees believe that paying homage to the Thongdrel brings spiritual merit and the potential for liberation.

The dzong has also appeared in popular culture; several scenes from the 1993 film Little Buddha were filmed at Paro Rinpung Dzong.

== Shrines and chapels ==
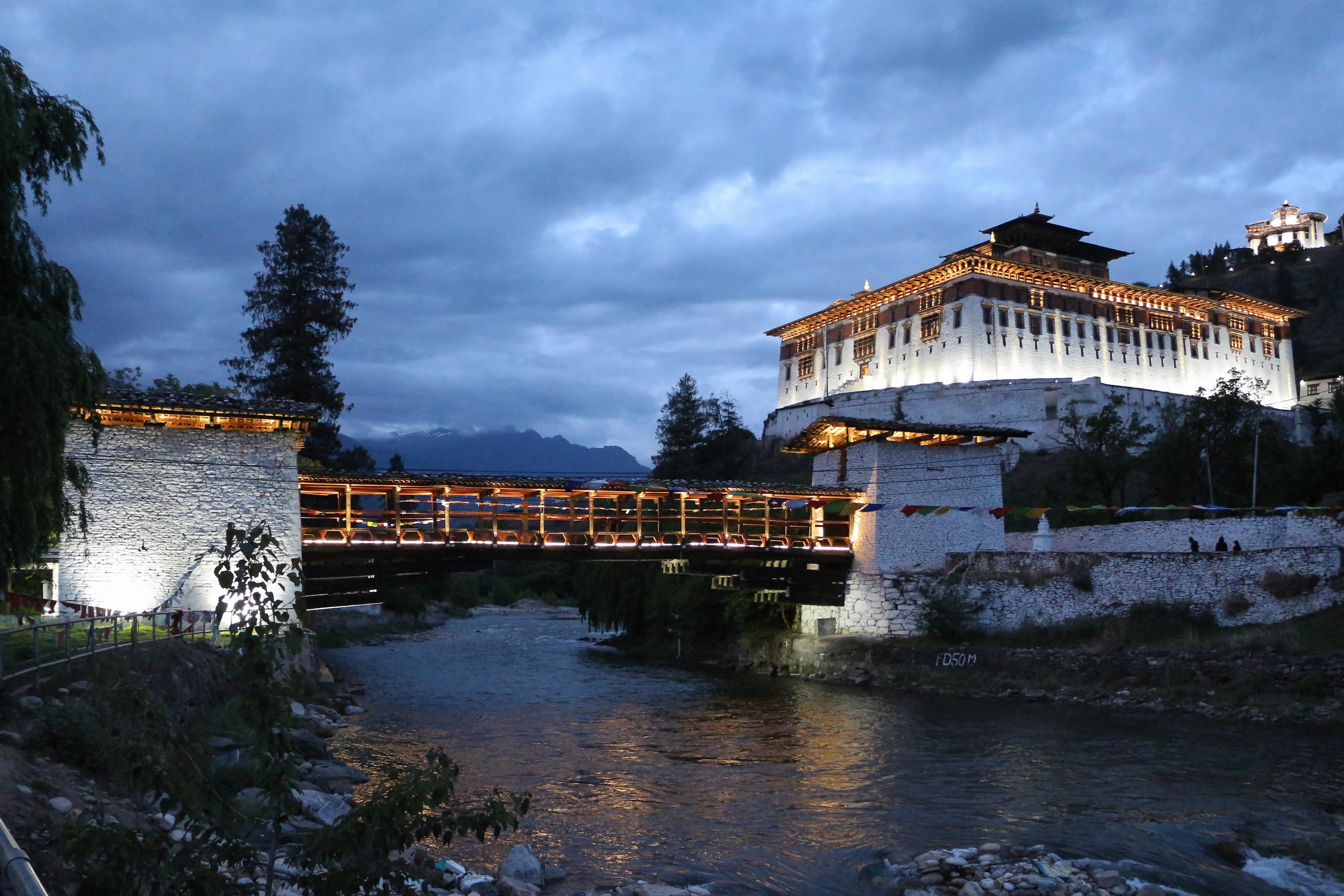
Rinpung Dzong and Nemi Zam bridge at sunset

Inside Rinpung Dzong are fourteen shrines and chapels:

1. Kungarwa
2. Monks' assembly hall
3. Sandalwood Stupa
4. Protector's shrine
5. Temple of the Guru's Eight Manifistations (Dzongkha: གུ་རུ་མཚན་རྒྱད་ལྷ་ཁང)
6. Chapel of the head lama
7. Chapel of Amitayus
8. The Clear Crystal Shrine
9. Chapel of the Eleven-faced Avalokiteśvara
10. Apartments of the Abbot
11. Chapel of Akshobhya
12. Temple of the Treasure Revealer
13. Apartments of the King (Gyalpo'i Zimchung)
14. Temple of the Bursar

Outside the main dzong is the Deyangkha Temple.

On the hill above Rinpung Dzong is a seven-storied the watchtower fortress or Ta Dzong built in 1649. In 1968 this was established as the home of the National Museum of Bhutan.

Just below Rinpung Dzong is a traditional covered cantilever bridge.

== Festival ==
A great annual festival or tshechu is held at Rinpung Dzong from the eleventh to the fifteenth day of the second month of the traditional Bhutanese lunar calendar (usually in March or April of the Gregorian calendar). On this occasion, holy images are taken in a procession. This is followed by a series of traditional mask dances conveying religious stories which are performed by monks for several days.

Before the break of dawn on the morning of the fifteenth day, a great sacred thongdrel banner thangka depicting the Eight Manifestations of Padmasambhava, (Guru Pema Jungney, Guru Nima Yoezer, Guru singye dradrong, Guru tshoki Dorji, Guru shacha singye, Guru pema gyelpo, Guru dorji dolo, and Guru lodan Chokse) is displayed for the public in the early morning hours, to keep to the tradition of not allowing sunlight to fall on it. The ground on which the monks perform the mask dance is called Deyangkha.

== Sources ==
- Dorji, Sangay (Dasho) (2008). The Biography of Zhabdrung Ngawang Namgyal: Pal Drukpa Rinpoche. Kinga, Sonam (trans.). Thimphu, Bhutan: KMT Publications. ISBN 99936-22-40-0.
- Thinley, Lopon Kunzang; KMT Research Group (2008). Seeds of Faith: A Comprehensive Guide to the Sacred Places of Bhutan. Volume 1. Thimphu: KMT Publications. ISBN 99936-22-41-9.
