= Outline of Bhutan =

Country in South Asia

The Flag of Bhutan

The Emblem of Bhutan

The location of Bhutan

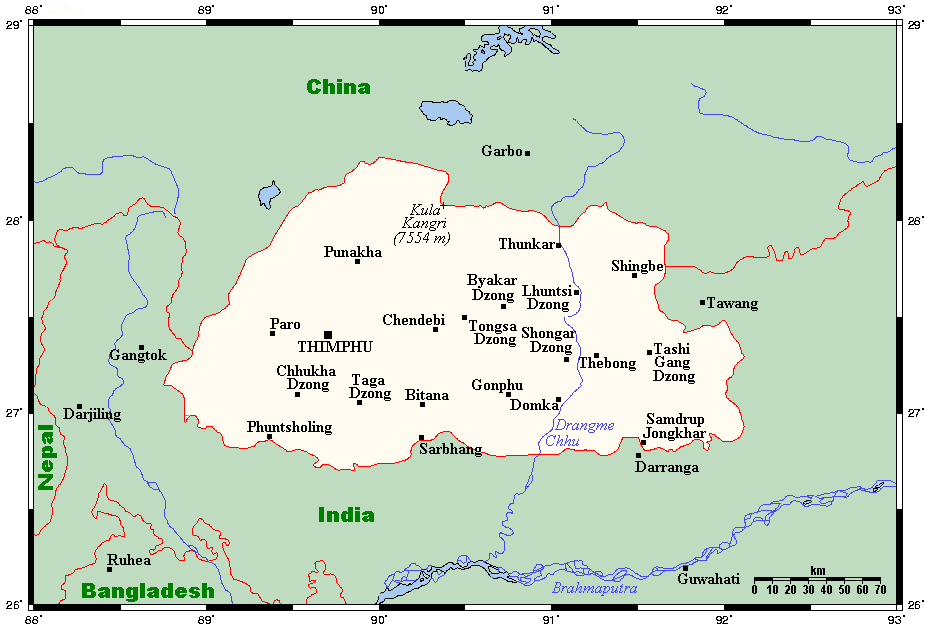
An enlargeable map of the Kingdom of Bhutan

The following outline is provided as an overview of and topical guide to Bhutan:

Bhutan – landlocked sovereign country located in South Asia. Bhutan is located amidst the eastern end of the Himalaya Mountains and is bordered to the south, east and west by India and to the north by China. Bhutan is separated from Nepal by the Indian state of Sikkim. The Bhutanese call their country Druk Yul (land of the thunder dragon).

Foreign influences and tourism in Bhutan are regulated by the government to preserve the nation's traditional culture, identity and the environment. in 2006 Business Week rated Bhutan the happiest country in Asia and the eighth happiest country in the world. The landscape ranges from subtropical plains in the south to the Himalayan heights in the north, with some peaks exceeding 7,000 metres (23,000 ft). The state religion is Vajrayana Buddhism, and the population is predominantly Buddhist, with Hinduism being the second-largest religion. The capital and largest city is Thimphu. After centuries of direct monarchic rule, Bhutan held its first democratic elections in March 2008. Bhutan is a member of the South Asian Association for Regional Cooperation (SAARC).

== General reference ==
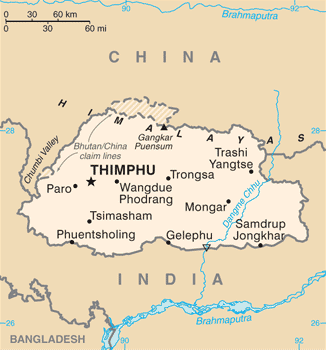
An enlargeable basic map of Bhutan

- Pronunciation: /buːˈtɑːn/
- Common English country name: Bhutan
- Official English country name: The Kingdom of Bhutan
- Common endonym(s): Druk Yul (Dzongkha: འབྲུག་ཡུལ་)
- Official endonym(s): Druk Gyal Khap (Dzongkha: འབྲུག་རྒྱལ་ཁབ་)
- Adjectival(s): Druk, Bhutanese
- Demonym(s): Bhutanese
- Etymology: Name of Bhutan
- International rankings of Bhutan
- ISO country codes: BT, BTN, 064
- ISO region codes: See ISO 3166-2:BT
- Internet country code top-level domain: .bt

== Geography of Bhutan ==
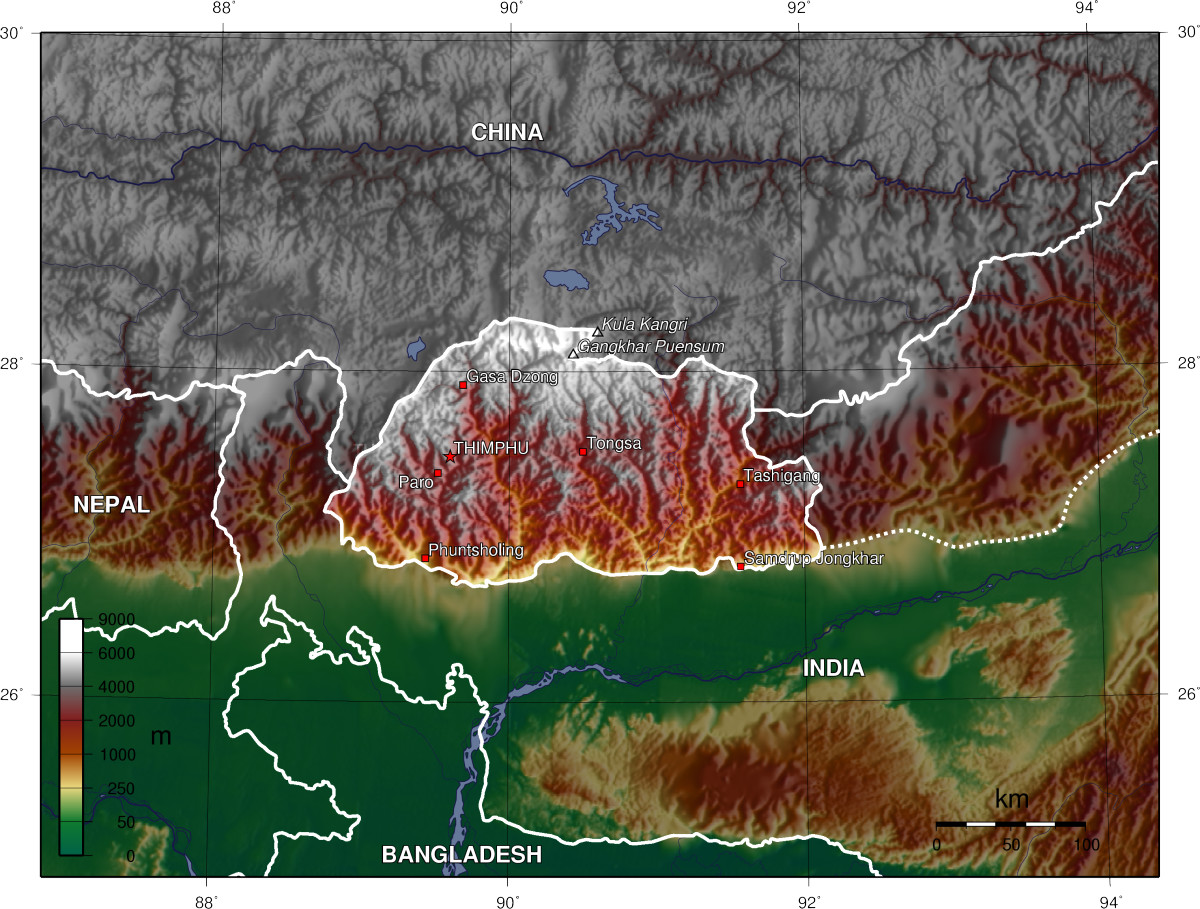
An enlargeable topographic map of Bhutan

Geography of Bhutan

- Bhutan is: a landlocked country
- Location:
  - Northern Hemisphere and Eastern Hemisphere
  - Eurasia
    - Asia
      - South Asia
        - Indian subcontinent
  - Time zone: Bhutan Time (UTC+06)
  - Extreme points of Bhutan
    - High: Gangkhar Puensum 7,570 m (24,836 ft)
    - Low: Drangme Chhu 97 m (318 ft)
  - Land boundaries: 1,075 km

India 605 km
China 470 km

- Coastline: none

- Population of Bhutan: 672,425(2005)
- Area of Bhutan: 47,000 square kilometres (18,000 sq mi) - 131st largest country
- Atlas of Bhutan

=== Environment of Bhutan ===
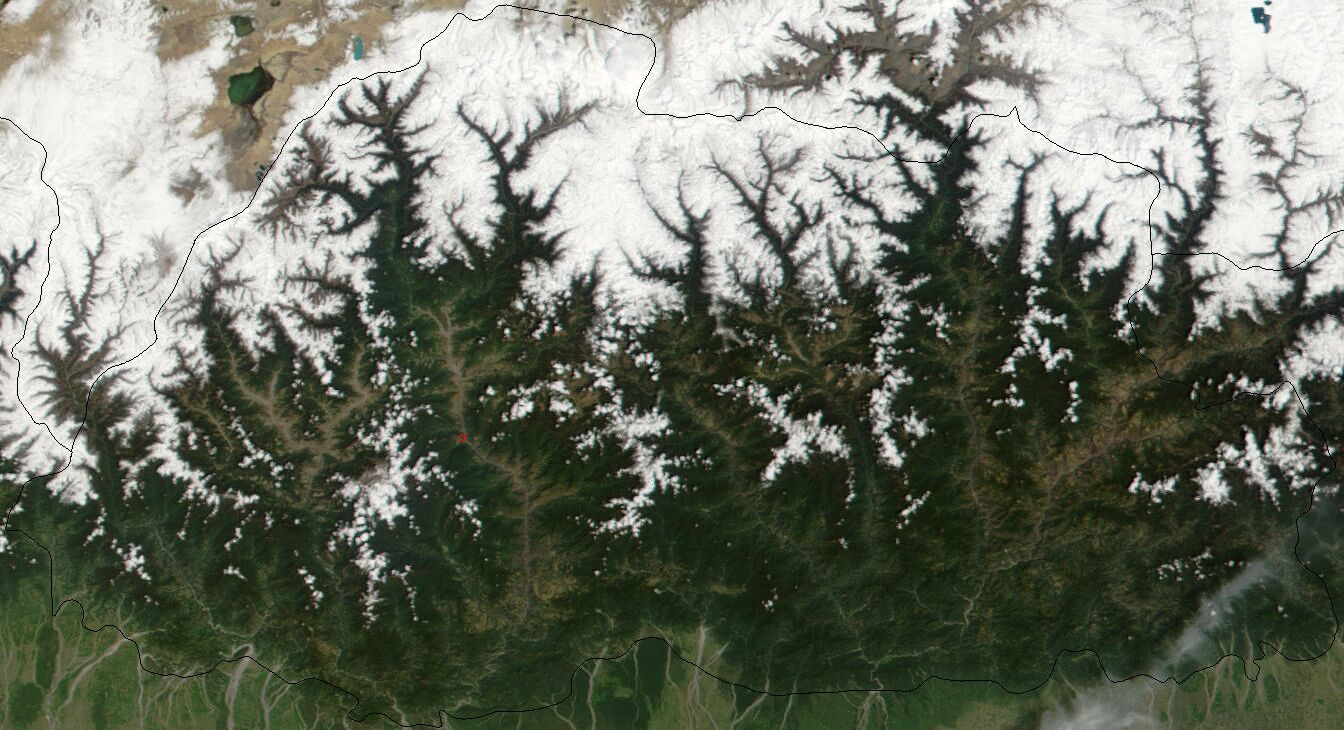
An enlargeable satellite image of Bhutan

Environment of Bhutan

- Climate of Bhutan
- Environmental issues in Bhutan
- Ecoregions in Bhutan
- Renewable energy in Bhutan
- Protected areas of Bhutan
- Wildlife of Bhutan
  - Fauna of Bhutan
    - Birds of Bhutan
    - Mammals of Bhutan

==== Natural geographic features of Bhutan ====
- Glaciers of Bhutan
- Lakes of Bhutan
- Mountains of Bhutan
- Rivers of Bhutan
- Valleys of Bhutan
- World Heritage Sites in Bhutan: None

=== Regions of Bhutan ===
==== Ecoregions of Bhutan ====
List of ecoregions in Bhutan

==== Administrative divisions of Bhutan ====
Administrative divisions of Bhutan

- Dzongkhags (districts) of Bhutan
  - Dungkhags (sub-districts) of Bhutan
    - Gewogs (village blocks) of Bhutan
      - Thromdes (municipalities) of Bhutan
      - Chiwogs (electoral constituencies) of Bhutan
        - Villages of Bhutan

===== Districts of Bhutan =====
Districts of Bhutan

District	Former spelling	Bhutanese	Romanization used by the Dzongkha Development Commission
Bumthang		བུམ་ཐང་	Bºumtha
Chukha	Chhukha	ཆུ་ཁ་	Chukha
Dagana		དར་དཀར་ནང་	Dºagana
Gasa		མགར་ས་	Gâsa
Haa		ཧད་ / ཧཱ་	Hâ
Lhuntse	Lhuntshi	ལྷུན་རྩེ་	Lhüntsi
Mongar		མོང་སྒར་	Mongga
Paro		སྤ་གྲོ་	Paro
Pemagatshel	Pemagatsel	པདྨ་དགའ་ཚལ་	Pemagatshä
Punakha		སྤུ་ན་ཁ་	Punakha
Samdrup Jongkhar		བསཾ་གྲུབ་ལྗོངས་མཁར་	Samdru Jongkha
Samtse	Samchi	བསམ་རྩེ་	Samtsi
Sarpang		གསར་སྦང་	Sarbang
Thimphu		ཐིམ་ཕུག་	Thimphu
Trashigang	Tashigang	བཀྲ་ཤིས་སྒང་	Trashigang
Trashiyangste		བཀྲ་ཤིས་གཡང་རྩེ་	Trashi'yangste
Trongsa	Tongsa	ཀྲོང་གསར་	Trongsa
Tsirang	Chirang	རྩི་རང་	Tsirang
Wangdue Phodrang	Wangdi Phodrang	དབང་འདུས་ཕོ་བྲང་	'Wangdi Phodrºa
Zhemgang	Shemgang	གཞལ་སྒང་	Zhºämgang

===== Gewogs (village blocks) of Bhutan =====
Gewogs of Bhutan

===== Municipalities of Bhutan =====
Thromde

- Capital of Bhutan: Thimphu
- Cities of Bhutan
- Cities, towns, and villages of Bhutan

=== Demography of Bhutan ===
Demographics of Bhutan

== Government and politics of Bhutan ==
Politics of Bhutan

- Form of government: constitutional monarchy
- Capital of Bhutan: Thimphu
- Elections
  - National Council, 2007–08
  - General election, 2008
  - Local elections, 2011 (2008)
- Political parties in Bhutan
- Taxation in Bhutan

=== Branches of government ===
Government of Bhutan

==== Executive branch of the government of Bhutan ====
- Head of state: Druk Gyalpo
- Head of government: Prime Minister of Bhutan
- Cabinet (government): Lhengye Zhungtshog

- Ministry of Agriculture
- Ministry of Economic Affairs
- Ministry of Education
- Ministry of Finance
- Ministry of Foreign Affairs
- Ministry of Health
- Ministry of Home and Cultural Affairs
- Ministry Information and Communications
- Ministry Labour and Human Resources
- Ministry Works and Human Settlement

==== Legislative branch of the government of Bhutan ====
- Parliament of Bhutan (bicameral)
  - Upper house: National Council of Bhutan
  - Lower house: National Assembly of Bhutan

==== Judicial branch of the government of Bhutan ====
Judicial system of Bhutan

- Royal Court of Justice
  - Supreme Court of Bhutan
  - High Court of Bhutan
  - Dzongkhag Court
  - Dungkhag Court

=== Foreign relations of Bhutan ===
Foreign relations of Bhutan

- Diplomatic missions in Bhutan
- Diplomatic missions of Bhutan

==== Bhutanese refugees ====
- Bhutanese refugees
  - Beldangi refugee camps
  - Goldhap refugee camp
  - Khudunabari refugee camp
  - Sanischare refugee camp
  - Timai refugee camp

==== International organization membership ====
The Kingdom of Bhutan is a member of:

- Asian Development Bank (ADB)
- Bay of Bengal Initiative for Multi-Sectoral Technical and Economic Cooperation (BIMSTEC)
- Colombo Plan (CP)
- Food and Agriculture Organization (FAO)
- Group of 77 (G77)
- International Bank for Reconstruction and Development (IBRD)
- International Civil Aviation Organization (ICAO)
- International Criminal Police Organization (Interpol)
- International Development Association (IDA)
- International Finance Corporation (IFC)
- International Fund for Agricultural Development (IFAD)
- International Monetary Fund (IMF)
- International Olympic Committee (IOC)
- International Organization for Migration (IOM) (observer)
- International Organization for Standardization (ISO) (correspondent)
- International Telecommunication Union (ITU)
- International Telecommunications Satellite Organization (ITSO)

- Nonaligned Movement (NAM)
- Organisation for the Prohibition of Chemical Weapons (OPCW)
- South Asia Co-operative Environment Programme (SACEP)
- South Asian Association for Regional Cooperation (SAARC)
- United Nations (UN)
- United Nations Conference on Trade and Development (UNCTAD)
- United Nations Educational, Scientific, and Cultural Organization (UNESCO)
- United Nations Industrial Development Organization (UNIDO)
- Universal Postal Union (UPU)
- World Customs Organization (WCO)
- World Federation of Trade Unions (WFTU)
- World Health Organization (WHO)
- World Intellectual Property Organization (WIPO)
- World Meteorological Organization (WMO)
- World Tourism Organization (UNWTO)
- World Trade Organization (WTO) (observer)

=== Law and order in Bhutan ===
Law of Bhutan

- Bhutanese legislation
  - Constitution of Bhutan
  - Bhutanese Citizenship Act 1958
  - Bhutanese Citizenship Act 1985
  - Local Government Act of Bhutan 2009
  - Tobacco Control Act of Bhutan 2010
- Human rights in Bhutan
  - Capital punishment in Bhutan
  - Freedom of religion in Bhutan
  - LGBT rights in Bhutan
- Law enforcement in Bhutan
  - Royal Bhutan Police
- Crime in Bhutan
- Tsa Yig (historical legal code)

=== Military of Bhutan ===
Military of Bhutan

- Command
  - Commander-in-chief: King of Bhutan
- Forces
  - Army of Bhutan
  - Navy of Bhutan: None
  - Air Force of Bhutan
- Military history of Bhutan

== History of Bhutan ==
History of Bhutan

- Timeline of the history of Bhutan

=== Historical events ===
- Bhutan War (Duar War)
- Slavery in Bhutan
- Treaty of Punakha

=== Historical families and figures ===
- Dorji family
  - Ugyen Dorji
  - Jigme Palden Dorji
- House of Wangchuck
  - Jigme Namgyal
  - Ugyen Wangchuck

=== Historical government ===
- Dzongpen
- Provinces of Bhutan
1. Bumthang Province
2. Daga Province
3. Kurmaed Province
4. Kurtoed Province
5. Paro Province
6. Punakha Province
7. Thimphu Province
8. Trongsa Province
9. Wangdue Phodrang Province
- Penlop
  - Penlop of Trongsa

==== Ancient Kingdoms ====
- Bumthang Kingdom

== Culture of Bhutan ==
Culture of Bhutan

- Architecture of Bhutan
- Cuisine of Bhutan
- Ethnic groups in Bhutan
- Media in Bhutan
- National symbols of Bhutan
  - Coat of arms of Bhutan
  - Flag of Bhutan
  - National anthem of Bhutan
- Prostitution in Bhutan
- Public holidays in Bhutan
  - Tsechus
- Religion in Bhutan
  - Buddhism in Bhutan
  - Christianity in Bhutan
  - Hinduism in Bhutan
  - Islam in Bhutan
- World Heritage Sites in Bhutan: None

=== Art in Bhutan ===
- Art in Bhutan
- Cinema of Bhutan
- Music of Bhutan
- Television in Bhutan

=== Languages in Bhutan ===
Languages of Bhutan

Languages of Bhutan
- Tibeto-Burman languages
  - Bodish languages
    - Tibetan languages (South Bodish, Central Bodish, West Bodish)
      - Dzongkha
      - Brokkat language
      - Brokpa language
      - Chocangacakha
      - Khams Tibetan language
      - Lakha
    - East Bodish languages
      - Bumthang language
      - Chali language
      - Dakpa language
      - Dzala language
      - Kheng language
      - Kurtöp language (Zhâke / Kurtoep-kha)
      - 'Olekha (Mönpa)
      - Nyenkha
    - Gongduk
    - Gurung
    - Kiranti (including Camling and Limbu)
    - Lepcha
    - Lhokpu
    - Nepal Bhasa
    - Tamang
    - Tshangla language(Sharchop-kha)
- Indo-Aryan languages
  - Nepali language

=== Sports in Bhutan ===
Sports in Bhutan

- Football in Bhutan
  - Bhutan national football team
- Cricket in Bhutan
  - Bhutan national cricket team
- Bhutan at the Olympics

== Economy and infrastructure of Bhutan ==
Economy of Bhutan

- Economic rank, by nominal GDP (2007): 162nd (one hundred and sixty second)
- Agriculture in Bhutan
- Banking in Bhutan
  - Royal Monetary Authority of Bhutan (central bank)
    - Currency of Bhutan: Ngultrum
      - ISO 4217: BTN
- Communications in Bhutan
  - Internet in Bhutan
- Companies of Bhutan
- Energy in Bhutan
- Health care in Bhutan
- Mining in Bhutan
- Royal Securities Exchange of Bhutan
- Tourism in Bhutan
- Transport in Bhutan
  - Airports in Bhutan
  - Rail transport in Bhutan
  - Roads in Bhutan
    - Lateral Road

== Education in Bhutan ==
Education in Bhutan

== Health in Bhutan ==
Health in Bhutan

== See also ==
Bhutan

- List of Bhutan-related topics
- List of international rankings
- Member state of the United Nations
- Outline of Asia
- Outline of geography

== Sources ==
- Wangchhuk, Lily (2008). Facts About Bhutan: The Land of the Thunder Dragon. Thimphu: Absolute Bhutan Books. ISBN 978-99936-760-0-3.
- "Bhutan". The World Factbook. United States Central Intelligence Agency. July 2, 2009. Archived from the original on January 11, 2021.
