= List of banks in Bhutan =

The following is a list of banks based and operating in Bhutan.

- Bank of Bhutan
- Bhutan National Bank
- Royal Monetary Authority of Bhutan
- Druk PNB Bank
- No Full form (T Bank)
- Bhutan Development Bank
- Digital Kidu Bank
