= Banking in Bhutan =

Banking in Bhutan, a small country in East Asia, is an industry that has grown slowly as the country has pursued modernization. The country has a vibrant informal culture of finance which only weakly integrates formal financial services.

Since its establishment in 1982, the Royal Monetary Authority of Bhutan, headquartered in Thimphu, has served as the central bank of Bhutan. The authority is responsible for issuing currency, implementing monetary policy, coordinating financial institution activities, and holding the government's foreign exchange earnings. Among its initial duties was the administration of financial assistance for rural development, a duty later delegated to the Bhutan Development Finance Corporation, which was founded in 1988.

== Overview ==
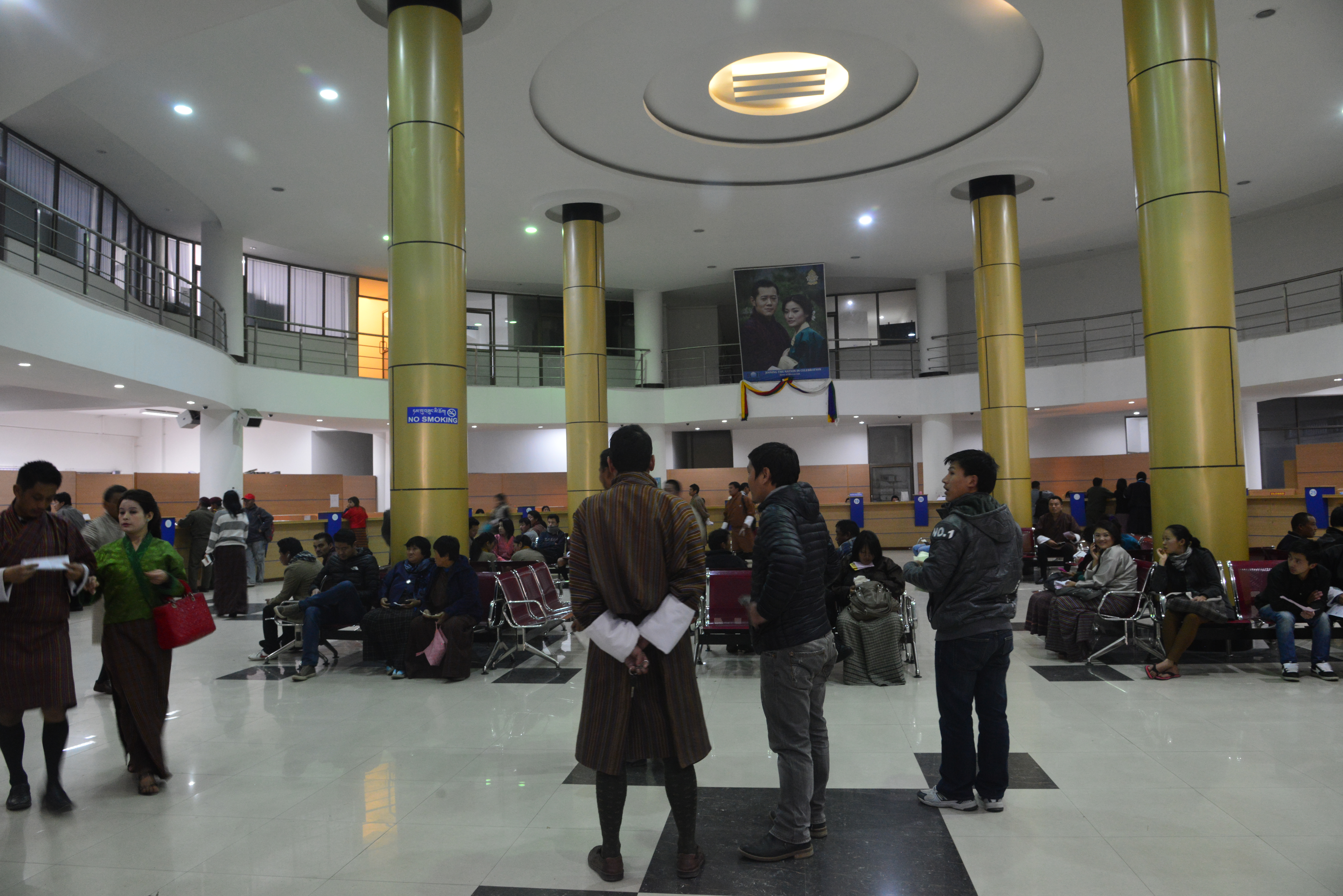
Bank of Bhutan, Thimphu - main hall

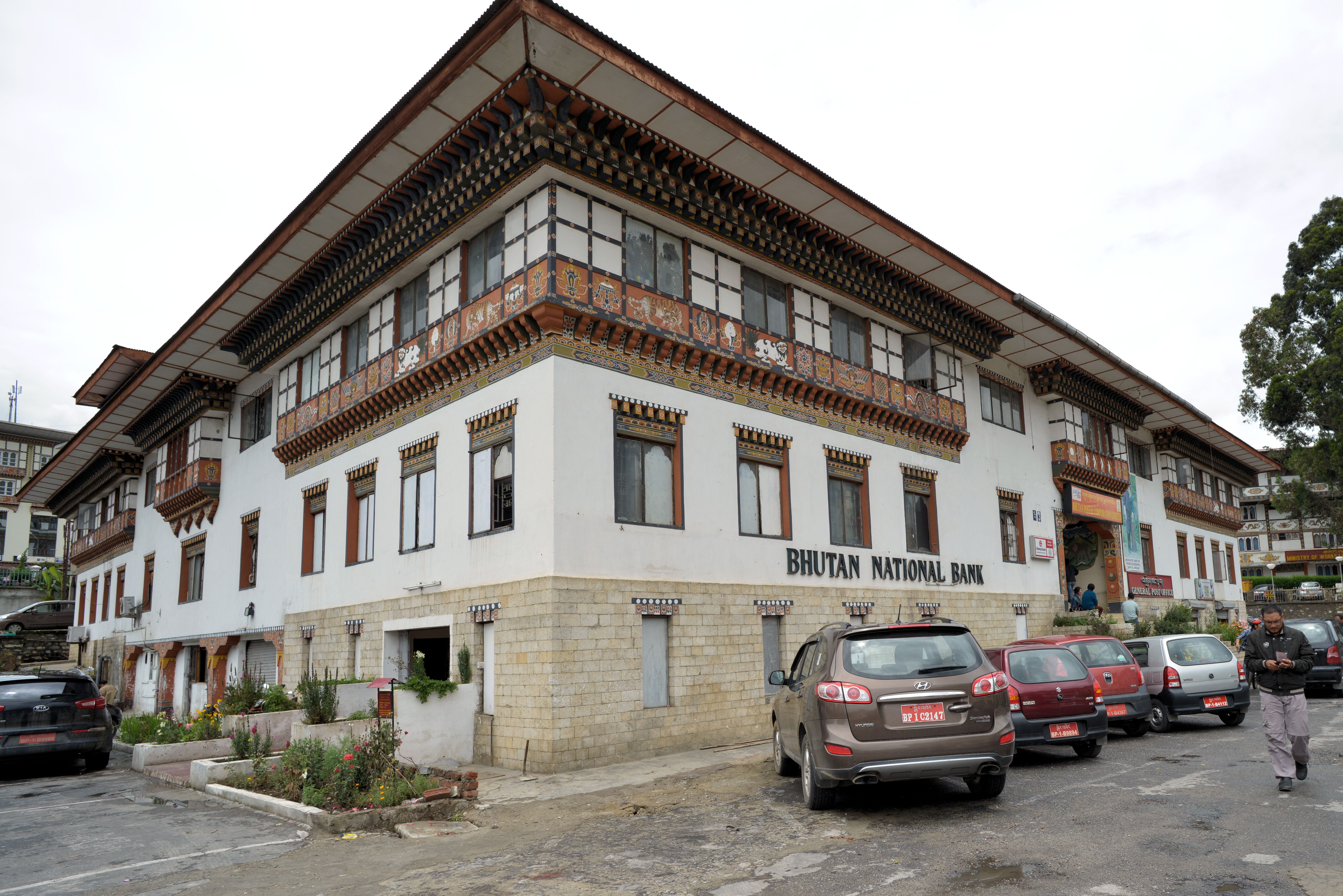
Main Branch, Bhutan National Bank Ltd, Thimphu.

There is no formal system of microfinance in Bhutan. However, informal intermediaries (broadly, moneylenders and "family and friends") provide limited financial services. Households in Bhutan have a vibrant, but informal, culture of savings, lending, and financial management, with formal financial services only weakly integrated. Rural areas, women, and youth are particularly underserved by formal financial services.

As of 2014, Bhutan's financial sector consists of five banks (Bank of Bhutan, Bhutan National Bank, Druk PNB Bank, T-Bank, Bhutan Development Bank) and three other organizations (Royal Insurance Corporation of Bhutan, Bhutan Insurance, National Pension and Provident Fund).

The Royal Monetary Authority is one of the primary regulators of financial institutions and is also responsible for Bhutan's monetary policy.

Bhutan's currency, the ngultrum, is pegged to the Indian rupee. This has created confidence in the ngultrum, but it also effectively makes India's monetary policy Bhutan's monetary policy. It has also made it difficult for Bhutan's monetary authorities to deal with economic imbalances caused by hydroelectric power projects. This in turn allowed consumption to rise and exacerbated the currency imbalances, so that new construction is done primarily in concrete and steel (which must be imported), and which also risks the peg's sustainability. As a result, the Royal Monetary Authority of Bhutan sold 20% of its United States dollar reserves in late 2011 and banned imports of vehicles, imports of construction materials, loans on vehicles, and loans on housing in early 2012.

== History ==
=== 1960s-1980s: Bhutan's Central Bank ===
Bhutan remained isolated from the world until it had trouble controlling its monetary system, so the Central Bank of Bhutan was established. Bhutan's commercial bank, Bank of Bhutan, was established on 28 May 1968 as a joint venture with the Chartered Bank of India, Australia and China, which owned 25% of the bank. In 1970, this share was transferred to the State Bank of India. The bank was restructured in the year 1971. Government departments were required to deposit all of their accounts with this bank to ensure that it had sufficient funds until 1982, when the Royal Monetary Authority was established. Since then, the Bank of Bhutan has been the retail banking agent for the Royal Monetary Authority.

The Royal Monetary Authority was established in 1983; before then, Bank of Bhutan was the country's central bank.

==== The Bhutan Development Finance Corporation/Bhutan Development Bank ====
The government of Bhutan established the Bhutan Development Finance Corporation (BDFCL) on 31 January 1988 with assistance from the Asian Development Bank to serve small and medium-sized enterprises, and it took over the administration of rural financial assistance from the Royal Monetary Authority. International multilateral organizations such as the Asian Development Bank subsidized BDFCL with grants and concessional loans. Loans were granted for improving farmland, obtaining livestock, and meeting short-term seasonal requirements. Some of the funding for the corporation, including an initial US$2.5 million loan in 1988 for the expansion of small- and medium-sized, private-sector industrial development, came from the Asian Development Bank. The corporation had been privatized by 1991.

==== Non-Bank Financial Institutions ====
As part of economic modernization, non-bank financial institutions also were set up. The Royal Insurance Corporation of Bhutan (RICBL), which offered insurance, was established in 1975 as the country's sole insurance company with headquarters in Phuntsholing. Here, the government owned 40% and the public owned 60%. It was mandated to offer all kinds of insurance products and invest the proceeds for its customers. As a result, it primarily focus on loans like a commercial bank. As of 2014, RICBL had a main office in Thimphu as well as 26 branches throughout the country. In 2000, the government of Bhutan reestablished the provident fund of the government employees and public sector companies of RICB Land as the National Pension and Provident Fund.

From 1980, individuals could also invest their savings in the newly-established Unit Trust of Bhutan, with its main office in Phuntsholing. This trust channels invested funds, for which it issues shares called units, into industrial and commercial development projects. As of 1991, the Government Employees' Provident Fund (established in 1986), the Bhutan Development Finance Corporation, and other non-bank institutions were of low influence, and were constrained by the rudimentary use of money in the economy.

=== Post-2000 ===
In 2002, the Bank of Bhutan's management was returned to the Government of Bhutan, which owns 80% of the bank through Druk Holdings and Investments, a state-owned enterprise; the State Bank of India holds the other 20%.

The Bank of Bhutan's principal office is in Phuntsholing. In 1991, there were twenty-six branch offices throughout the country; by 2014, the bank had expanded to 28 branches, 12 extension counters for covering limited banking services, and over 60 ATMs in Bhutan; and as of July 2017, there were 47 branches across the country. With these resources, the Bank of Bhutan has been able to give relatively large loans for capital programs such as irrigation projects in Bhutan's south-central region. Among its retail banking activities is the issuance of rupee-denomination traveler's cheques, which began in 1974.

In 2010, BDFCL became the Bhutan Development Bank Ltd. (BDB), an ordinary commercial bank. As of 2014, BDB has more than 30 branches, 5 field offices, and 5 ATMs.

Bhutan National Bank had upgraded to "Flexcube CBS technology" by 2012 and introduced Internet banking and ATMs. From 2008 to 2010, Bank of Bhutan Ltd. used "core bank solution technology" to connect all its branches to a central server, enabling customers to operate from any branch. The Royal Monetary Authority of Bhutan created the “Bhutan Financial Switch”, a central switch that connects all banks in Bhutan and allows customers of any bank to withdraw funds from any ATM.

=== Board members ===
As of 2021 the bank has six board members, including personnel from the Department of Finance and from the Ministry of Information and Communications.

Members of the Board of the Bank of Bhutan
Board Member	Position	Current Address
Mr. Karma Yonten	Chairperson	Office of Performance Management, His Majesty's Secretariat
Ms. Tashi Lhamo	Director	Director, Department of Finance, DHI
Mr. Pemba Wangchuk	Director	Director General, RSTA, MoIC
Dr. Phuntsho Choden	Independent Director	Consultant & Researcher, Changtagang, Below Begana Road, Thimphu
Mr. Kezang	Independent Director	CEO, Institute for Management Studies, Thimphu
Mr. Dorji Kadin	Execuative Director	CEO, Bank of Bhutan Ltd., Thimphu

== See also ==
- Bank of Bhutan (official website)
