= Royal Securities Exchange of Bhutan =

Stock exchange in Bhutan

- Type: Stock exchange
- Location: Thimphu, Bhutan
- Founded: 1993
- Currency: Bhutanese ngultrum (BTN)
- No. of listings: 18 (December 2025)
- Market cap: Nu. 54.50 billion (December 2025)
- Indices: Bhutan Stock Index
- Website: rsebl.org.bt

The Royal Securities Exchange of Bhutan is the only stock exchange in Bhutan. It is one of the world's smallest stock exchanges, with a market capitalization of around 738 million dollars and 18 listed companies as of December 2024. As of 2024, market capitalization in Bhutanese Ngultrum (BTN) is 62,000,000,000.

It is located in the Royal Insurance Corporation of Bhutan (RICBL) building in Thimphu. The capital for the establishment of the stock exchange was provided by Bank of Bhutan, the Royal Insurance Corporation of Bhutan, Unit Trust of Bhutan (now Bhutan National Bank) and the Bhutan Development Finance Corporation.

== Listed companies ==
As of December 2025, the following companies are listed on the exchange, with market capitalisation on 31 December 2025.

Symbol	Company	Market capitalisation (Nu.)
BBPL	Bhutan Board Products Limited	336,003,920
BCCL	Bhutan Carbide and Chemicals Limited	434,000,000
BFAL	Bhutan Ferro Alloys Limited	1,622,850,000
BIL	Bhutan Insurance Limited	3,445,800,000
BNBL	Bhutan National Bank Limited	14,597,755,426
BPCL	Bhutan Polymers Company Limited	105,966,950
BTCL	Bhutan Tourism Corporation Limited	1,130,760,000
DFAL	Druk Ferro Alloys Limited	2,166,041,543
DPL	Dungsam Polymers Limited	155,777,970
DPNB	Druk PNB Bank Limited	5,208,125,364
DWAL	Druk Wang Alloys Limited	3,703,274,128
GICB	Bhutan Reinsurance Company Limited	3,080,000,000
KCL	Kuensel Corporation Limited	157,450,000
PCAL	Penden Cement Authority Limited	1,675,524,620
RICBL	Royal Insurance Corporation of Bhutan Limited	12,226,003,903
STCBL	State Trading Corporation of Bhutan Limited	1,066,510,942
SVL	Sherza Ventures Limited	68,386,032
TBL	T-Bank Limited	3,320,711,672
Total		54,500,942,469

=== Delisted companies ===
Symbol	Company	Year delisted
BBCL	Bhutan Beverages Company Limited	2007
BDAL	Bhutan Dairy and Agro Products Limited	2010
DPCL	Druk Petroleum Corporation Limited	2011
DML	Druk Mining Limited	2011
BTL	Bhutan Times Limited	2014
DPOP	Druk Plaster and Chemicals Limited	2020
EBCC	S.D Eastern Bhutan Coal Company Limited	2020
JMCL	Jigme Mining Corporation Limited	2021
DSCL	Druk Satair Corporation Limited	2023

== See also ==
- Asia-Pacific Central Securities Depository Group
