= Economy of Bhutan =

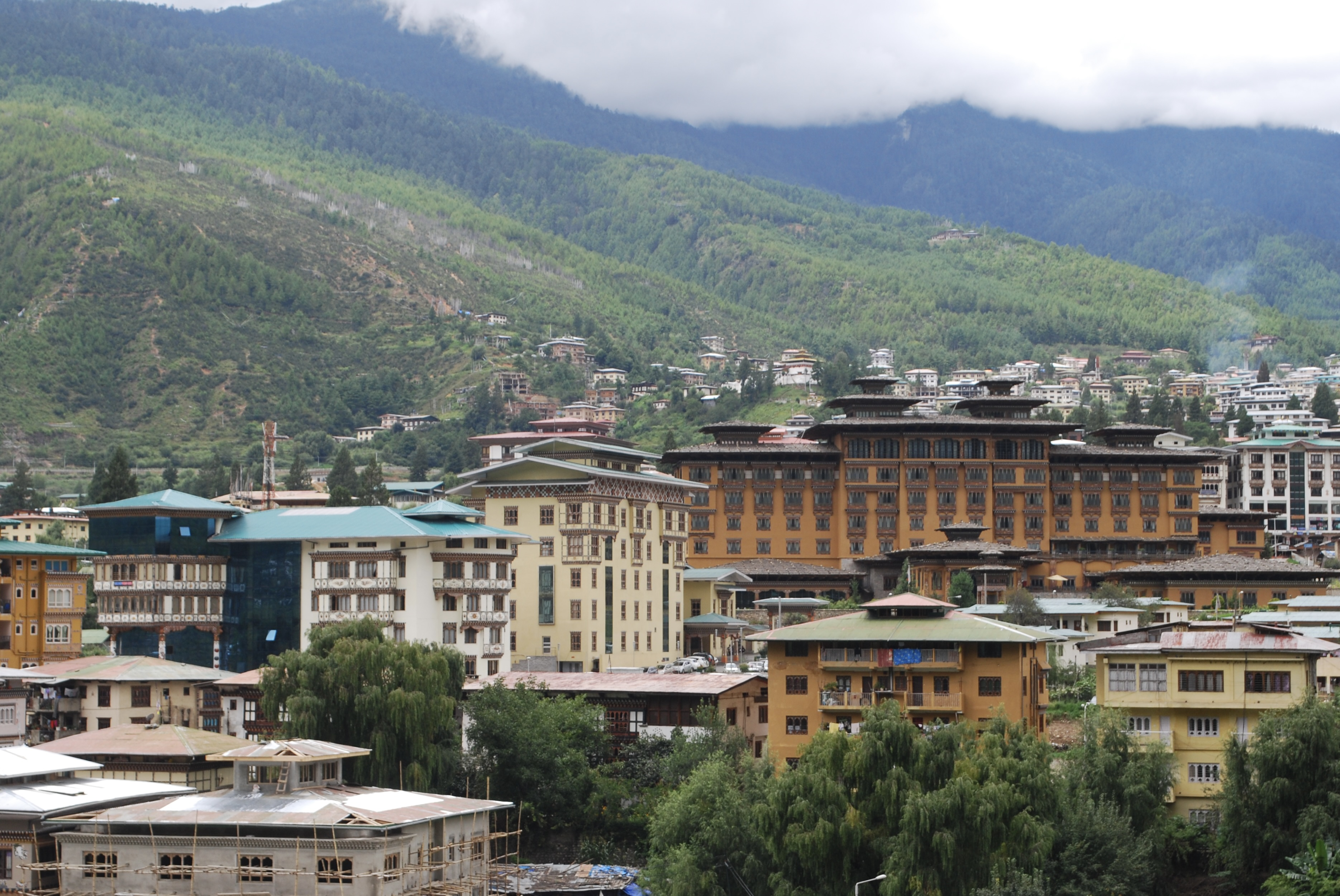
- Thimphu is the largest economic centre of Bhutan.
- Currency: Ngultrum (BTN)
- Fiscal year: 1 July – 30 June
- Trade organisations: SAFTA
- Country group: Developing/Emerging; Lower middle income economy

Statistics
- Population: ▲780,000 (2021)
- GDP: ▲$3.856 billion (nominal; 2026); ▲$15.953 billion (PPP; 2026)
- GDP rank: 128th (nominal; 2026); 162nd (PPP; 2026)
- GDP growth: ▲4.8% (2022); ▲5.0% (2023); ▲4.0% (2024f); ▲7.0% (2025f)
- GDP per capita: ▲$4,867 (nominal; 2026); ▲$20,135 (PPP; 2026)
- GDP by sector: Agriculture: 15%; Industry: 29.6%; Services: 52.7%; (2023 est.)
- Inflation (CPI): 7.35% (2021)
- Population below national poverty line: 8.2% (2017); ▼9.8% on less than $3.20/day (2020f)
- Gini coefficient: 37.4 medium (2017, World Bank)
- Human Development Index: ▲0.698 medium (2023) (129th); ▲0.478 low IHDI (2023)
- Corruption Perceptions Index: 68 out of 100 points (2023, 26th rank)
- Labour force: ▲381,742 (2019); Major shortage of skilled labour; ▲61.6% employment rate (2015)
- Labour force by occupation: Agriculture: 58%; Industry: 20%; Services: 22%; (2015 est.)
- Unemployment: ▼2.9% (2024 est.)
- Main industries: Cement, wood products, processed fruits, alcoholic beverages, calcium carbide, tourism

External
- Exports: ▲$345 million (2021)
- Export goods: Iron, steel, salt, sulphur, cement, aircraft
- Main export partners: India 87.6%; Italy 4.72%; Colombia 1.89%; Singapore 1.17%; China 0.67% (2022)
- Imports: ▲$1.12 billion (2021)
- Import goods: machinery, minerals, motor vehicles, metals
- Main import partners: India 74.9%; China 12.2%; Indonesia 4.98%; Thailand 1.82%; Singapore 1.26% (2022)
- FDI stock: ▼$160.4 million (31 December 2017 est.); Abroad: n/a
- Current account: ▲ −$547 million (2017 est.)
- Gross external debt: ▲$2.671 billion (31 December 2017 est.)

Public finance
- Government debt: ▼106.3% of GDP (2017 est.)
- Foreign reserves: ▼$922 million (September 2025)
- Budget balance: −3.4% (of GDP) (2017 est.)
- Revenue: $655.3 million (2017 est.)
- Spending: $737.4 million (2017 est.) (Note: The Government of India finances nearly one-quarter of Bhutan's budget expenditures.)
- Economic aid: $985 million (India) (2015-16)
- All values, unless otherwise stated, are in US dollars.

The economy of Bhutan is based on agriculture and forestry, which provide the main livelihood for more than 60% of the population. Agriculture consists largely of subsistence farming and animal husbandry. Rugged mountains dominate the terrain and make the building of roads and other infrastructure difficult. Bhutan is among the richest by gross domestic product (nominal) per capita in South Asia, at $3,491 as of 2022, but it still places 153rd, and among the poorest in the world. The total gross domestic product is only $2.898 billion, placing Bhutan at 178th according to the IMF.

Bhutan's economy is closely aligned with India's through strong trade and monetary links and dependence on India's financial assistance, same for China, however, they have a border dispute. Most production in the industrial sector is of the cottage industry type. Most development projects, such as road construction, rely on Indian migrant labour. Model education, social, and environment programmes are underway with support from multilateral development organisations.

Each economic programme takes into account the government's desire to protect the country's environment and cultural traditions. For example, the government, in its cautious expansion of the tourist sector, encourages visits by upscale, environmentally conscientious tourists. Detailed controls and uncertain policies in areas such as industrial licensing, trade, labour, and finance continue to hamper foreign investment. Hydropower exports to India have boosted Bhutan's overall growth, even though GDP fell in 2008 as a result of a slowdown in India, its predominant export market.

== Economic history ==
Since 1961, the government of Bhutan has guided the economy through five-year plans in order to promote economic development.

In the 1970s, the king placed importance on Gross National Happiness (GNH) over gross domestic product (GDP).

In 2010, Bhutan became the first country in the world to ban smoking and the selling of tobacco. In order to stamp out cross-border smuggling during the pandemic, a new Tobacco Control Rules and Regulations (TCRR) 2021 allowed the import, sales and consumption of tobacco products.

On 8 December 2023, Bhutan graduated from the UN's list of least developed countries (LDCs), making it only the 7th country to do so and the first in 3 years.

== Membership of economic organisations and agreements ==
In terms of trade, Bhutan is a member of the South Asian Free Trade Area (SAFTA) and the Bay of Bengal Initiative for Multi-Sectoral Technical and Economic Cooperation (BIMSTEC) and the South Asia Subregional Economic Cooperation (SASEC). Bhutan is also a member of the pan-Asian Asia Cooperation Dialogue (ACD), and the Asian Development Bank.

Bhutan first applied to join the WTO in 1999 and as an applicant, was quickly granted observer status Beyond that, ascension proceedings at the WTO have been much delayed and periodically put on pause, largely stemming from concerns and considerations of the Bhutanese government itself. The Bhutanese government approved ascension to the WTO in April 2023, at least partly hastened by the country's upcoming graduation from the UN-defined 'least developed country (LDC) category. Under WTO rules and processes, ascent of a country with LDC status comes with some leniency in certain requirements, more relaxed timeframes for compliance, and additional support; so, whilst the loss of LDC status, as happened in December 2023, was a reflection of Bhutan's success and development progress, it also meant much further delay in WTO ascension (that is, ascent after the loss of LDC status) would make the journey through to full WTO member status even harder.

== Economic sectors ==
=== Agriculture ===
Agriculture in Bhutan has a dominant role in the Bhutan's economy. In 2000, agriculture accounted for 35.9% of GDP of the nation. The share of the agricultural sector in GDP declined from approximately 55% in 1985 to 33% in 2003. Despite this, agriculture remains the primary source of livelihood for the majority of the population. Pastoralism and farming are naturally complementary modes of subsistence in Bhutan.

Cereals are important component of Bhutanese diet; maize and rice are the major crops cultivated. Other cultivated crops include wheat, barley, oil seeds, potato, and various vegetables. Among vegetables, chili and potato are most important. In addition, cash crops, such as apple, orange, and cardamom are cultivated and exported.

=== Banking ===
Since the early 2020s, Bhutan has adopted cryptocurrency, particularly Bitcoin, as a strategic economic resource. Facing declining tourism revenue, youth unemployment (which reached 19% in 2024), and a growing brain drain, the government began mining Bitcoin using surplus hydropower during high-flow summer months. By 2023, Bhutan had sold $100 million in cryptocurrency to double civil servant salaries, leading to a drop in resignations. As of April 2025, blockchain analysts estimate Bhutan's Bitcoin holdings at over $600 million; around 30% of its GDP. Mining is powered by the kingdom's carbon-negative hydropower and cool climate, aligning with its environmental values. Bhutan also plans to develop Gelephu Mindfulness City, a sustainable economic hub.

=== Education ===
Western-style education was introduced to Bhutan during the reign of Ugyen Wangchuck (1907–25). Until the 1950s, the only formal education available to Bhutanese students, except for private schools in Ha and Bumthang, was through Buddhist monasteries. In the 1950s, several private secular schools were established without government support, and several others were established in major district towns with government backing. By the late 1950s, there were twenty-nine government and thirty private primary schools, but only about 2,500 children were enrolled. Secondary education was available only in India. Eventually, the private schools were taken under government supervision to raise the quality of education provided. Although some primary schools in remote areas had to be closed because of low attendance, the most significant modern developments in education came during the period of the First Development Plan (1961–66), when some 108 schools were operating and 15,000 students were enrolled.

The Human Rights Measurement Initiative (HRMI) finds that Bhutan is fulfilling only 73.1% of what it should be fulfilling for the right to education based on the country's level of income. HRMI breaks down the right to education by looking at the rights to both primary education and secondary education. While taking into consideration Bhutan's income level, the nation is achieving 73.8% of what should be possible based on its resources (income) for primary education but only 72.5% for secondary education.

=== Fishing ===
A significant food source in Bhutan is fishing, both from cold-water streams and lakes (primarily trout) and warm-water fisheries (primarily carp).

=== Forestry ===
One of Bhutan's significant natural resources in the late twentieth century was its rich forests and natural vegetation. Bhutan's location in the eastern Himalayas, with its subtropical plains and alpine terrain, gives it more rainfall than its neighbors to the west, a factor greatly facilitating forest growth. The forests contain numerous deciduous and evergreen species, ranging from tropical hardwoods to predominantly oak and pine forests.

=== Healthcare ===
Health in Bhutan is one of the government's highest priorities in its scheme of development and modernization. Health and related issues are overseen by the Ministry of Health, itself represented on the executive Lhengye Zhungtshog (cabinet) by the Minister of Health. As a component of Gross National Happiness, affordable and accessible health care is central to the public policy of Bhutan.

The Constitution of Bhutan charges the Royal Government with ensuring a "safe and healthy environment," and with providing "free access to basic public health services in both modern and traditional medicines".

The Human Rights Measurement Initiative finds that Bhutan is fulfilling 85.5% of what it should be fulfilling for the right to health based on its level of income. When looking at the right to health with respect to children, Bhutan achieves 91.8% of what is expected based on its current income. In regards to the right to health amongst the adult population, the country achieves only 80.7% of what is expected based on the nation's level of income. Bhutan falls into the "bad" category when evaluating the right to reproductive health because the nation is fulfilling only 84.1% of what the nation is expected to achieve based on the resources (income) it has available.

=== Mining ===
Mining of industrial minerals was insignificant to Bhutan’s economy except for the production of ferrosilicon. The country’s rugged terrain provides sites to harvest hydropower, which has driven rapid growth in the transport and construction sectors, including the startup of a number of local cement operations.

=== Tourism ===
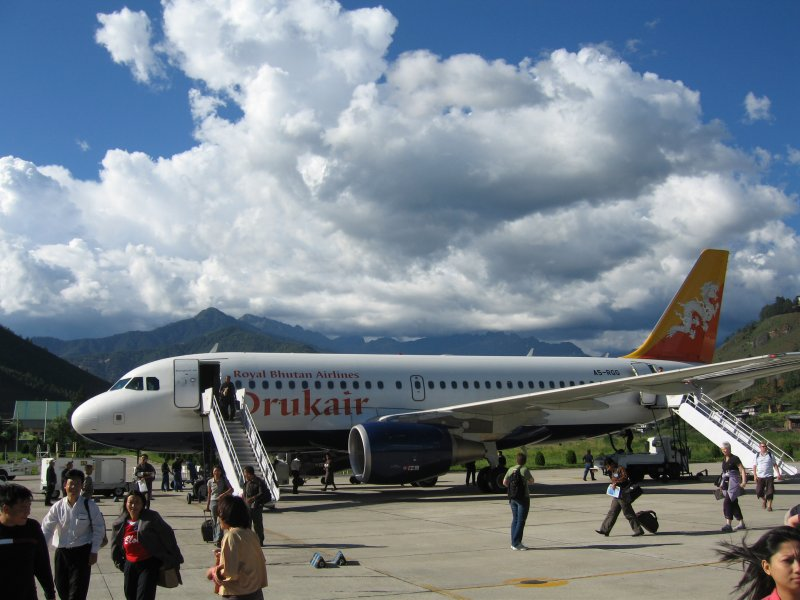
Passengers disembarking from Druk Air's Airbus A319 at Paro Airport

Tourism in Bhutan began in 1974, when the Government of Bhutan, in an effort to raise revenue and to promote Bhutanese unique culture and traditions to the outside world, opened its isolated country to foreigners. In 1974 a total of 287 tourists visited the Kingdom of Bhutan. The number of tourists visiting Bhutan increased to 2,850 in 1992, and rose dramatically to 7,158 in 1999. By the late 1980s tourism contributed over US$2 million in annual revenue.

Though open to foreigners, the Bhutanese government is aware of the environmental impact tourists can have on Bhutan's unique and virtually unspoiled landscape and culture. Accordingly, they have restricted the level of tourist activity from the start, preferring higher-quality tourism. Initially, this policy was known as "high value, low volume" tourism. It was renamed in 2008 as "high value, low impact", "a subtle but significant shift". While the low impact is guaranteed through the low number of visitors, it is a requirement to be wealthy to travel Bhutan, which leaves room for criticism and the question whether one has to be wealthy to be a "high value tourist". For tourists a US$ 100 per person per day fee is imposed, except for Indian, Maldivian, and Bangladeshi nationals. In 2005 a document called "Sustainable Tourism Development Strategy" "placed greater emphasis on increasing tourist numbers by using the country's culture and environment to promote Bhutan as an exotic niche destination attractive to wealthy tourists". The most important centres for tourism are in Bhutan's capital, Thimphu, and in the western city of Paro, Taktshang, a cliff-side monastery (called the "Tiger's Nest" in English) overlooking the Paro Valley, is one of the country's attractions. This temple is sacred to Buddhists. Housed inside the temple is a cave in which the Buddhist Deity who brought Buddhism to Bhutan meditated for 90 days in order to spread Buddhism. The temple has been standing for well over a thousand years.

In order to grow and promote tourism while encouraging sustainability and community development, the Department of Tourism (DoT) launched the "Friends of Tourism" initiative on 28 December 2024 at the Changyul Park to celebrate a historic milestone for Bhutan’s tourism industry—the Druk Thuksey Medal conferred to the industry by His Majesty The King. The program's goal is to bring people and organisations together as partners in order to support Bhutan's goals, develop the country's tourism industry, and provide meaningful experiences. Additionally, the DoT started a monthly tourism bulletin to update stakeholders on developments in the sector. According to the bulletin report, 15,990 tourists visited Bhutan in November 2024. Of these, 7,034 were international tourists, while 8,956 were from India. An estimated 7,986 visitors arrived via Paro International Airport, 8,018 via the Phuentsholing Integrated Check Post, 41 by Samdrupjongkhar, and 16 via Gelephu each.

Yearly tourist arrivals in thousands

== Infrastructure ==
=== Energy ===
Bhutan electricity production

Energy in Bhutan has been a primary focus of development in the kingdom under its Five-Year Plans. In cooperation with India, Bhutan has undertaken several hydroelectric projects whose output is traded between the countries. Though Bhutan's many hydroelectric plants provide energy far in excess of its needs in the summer, dry winters and increased fuel demand makes the kingdom a marginal net importer of energy from India.

Bhutan’s installed power generation capacity is approximately 1.6 gigawatts (GW). Over 99 percent of the country's installed capacity comes from hydropower plants, accounting for 1,614 megawatts (MW) of the country’s total capacity of 1,623 MW in 2018.

More than 99.97 percent of households have access to electricity. As of 2011, the Bhutanese government supplied electricity to 60 percent of rural households, a significant increase from about 20 percent in 2003. About 2,500 people use solar power throughout Bhutan. Even where electricity was available for lighting, most rural households cooked by wood fire. Rural homes were often heated with firewood, kerosene, or liquefied petroleum gas.

Bhutan has no natural petroleum or natural gas reserves. The kingdom has some 1.3 million tonnes of coal reserves, but extracts only about 1,000 tonnes of coal yearly, entirely for domestic consumption. Bhutan also imports oil at some 1,000 barrels per day. Most oil imports supplied fuel for automobiles.

Bhutan remains overall carbon-neutral and a net sink for greenhouse gases. As Bhutan develops and modernizes, however, its domestic demand for energy in household, commercial, and industrial sectors has been steadily increasing.

=== Transport ===
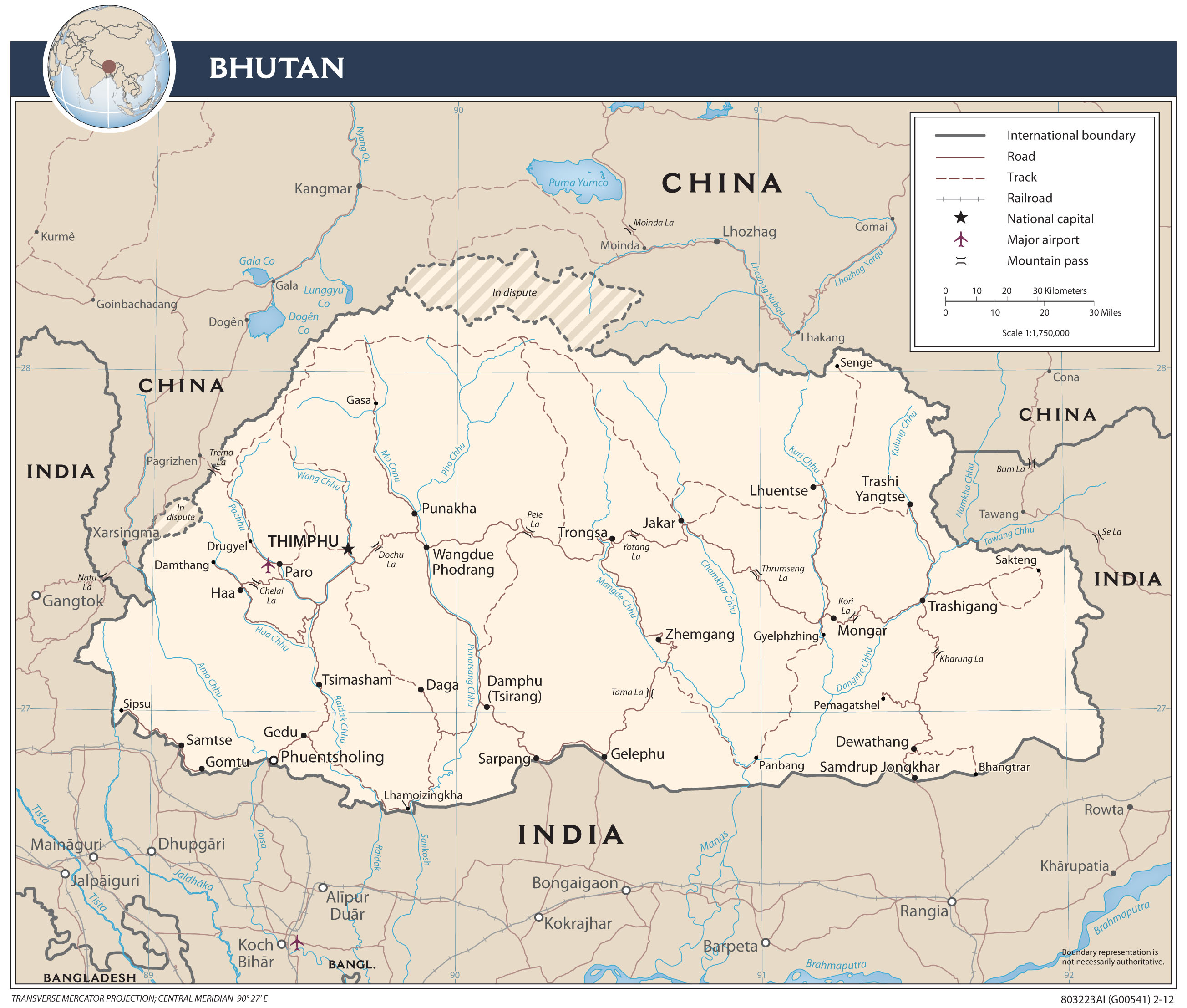
Map of transport system in Bhutan, 2012

Transport in Bhutan uses about 8,000 kilometres (5,000 mi) of roads and four airports, three of which are operational and interconnected. Paro Airport is the only airport which accommodates international flights. As part of Bhutan's infrastructure modernization programs, its road system has been under development since the 1960s. There are no railways (although one is planned), and as Bhutan is a landlocked country with no major waterways, there are no ports.

=== Telecommunications ===
Telecommunications in Bhutan includes telephones, radio, television, and the Internet.

== Macroeconomic statistics ==
Exports of Bhutan by product category (2019) Chemical products Transportation Machines Mineral products Plastics and rubbers Metals Foodstuffs Precious metals Textiles Instruments Animal products Vegetable products Paper goods Footwear and headwear Miscellaneous Stone and glass Wood products Animal and vegetable bi-products Animal hides Arts and antiques Weapons

=== Main indicators ===
The following table shows the main economic indicators in 1980-2026. Inflation below 5% is in green.

Year	GDP			GDP growth (real)	Inflation	Government debt (% of GDP)
Year	Total (bil. US$ PPP)	Per capita (US$ PPP)	Total (bil. US$ nominal)	GDP growth (real)	Inflation	Government debt (% of GDP)
1980	0.24	567	0.13	▲5.0%	▲12.5	n/a
1985	▲0.46	▲954	▲0.17	▲4.3%	▲8.0	n/a
1990	▲0.93	▲1686	▲0.29	▲9.1%	▲9.4	n/a
1995	▲1.26	▲2400	▲0.31	▲6.0%	▲7.1	▲38.7
2000	▲1.86	▲3195	▲0.45	▲6.9%	▲7.2	▲44.0
2005	▲3.01	▲4590	▲0.82	▲6.1%	▲4.8	▲80.8
2006	▲3.30	▲4952	▲0.88	▲6.3%	▲4.9	▼80.1
2007	▲3.76	▲5576	▲1.07	▲11.0%	▲5.2	▼67.3
2008	▲4.21	▲6174	▲1.36	▲9.9%	▲6.3	▼60.6
2009	▲4.50	▲6520	▼1.27	▲6.1%	▲7.1	▲61.0
2010	▲5.03	▲7201	▲1.53	▲10.3%	▲4.8	▼55.8
2011	▲5.67	▲8033	▲1.88	▲10.5%	▲8.6	▲62.3
2012	▲6.16	▲8640	▲1.97	▲6.8%	▲10.1	▲71.5
2013	▲6.48	▲8986	▲2.00	▲3.4%	▲8.1	▲87.4
2014	▲6.85	▲9389	▼1.96	▲3.8%	▲9.6	▲89.8
2015	▲7.35	▲9967	▲2.16	▲6.3%	▲6.7	▲90.2
2016	▲7.98	▲10719	▲2.25	▲7.6%	▲3.3	▲103
2017	▲8.54	▲11368	▲2.46	▲5.2%	▲4.3	▲104.1
2018	▲8.89	▲11743	▲2.65	▲2.8%	▲3.6	▼103.4
2019	▲9.46	▲12415	▼2.62	▲4.6%	▲2.8	▼100.8
2020	▲9.88	▲12879	▼2.59	▼ -2.5%	▲3.0	▲116
2021	▼9.86	▼12762	▲2.62	▼ -3.3%	▲8.2	▲124.5
2022	▲11.07	▲14229	▲2.87	▲4.8%	▲5.9	▼119.9
2023	▲12.05	▲15373	▲2.92	▲4.9%	▲4.5	▼117.2
2024	▲13.10	▲16602	▲3.15	▲6.1%	▲4.3	▼108.7
2025	▲14.43	▲18251	▲3.47	▲7.1%	▲2.6	▼103.6
2026	▲15.95	▲20135	▲3.86	▲7.5%	▲4.0	▲120.3

== See also ==
- List of companies of Bhutan
- Taxation in Bhutan
- Ministry of Finance (Bhutan)
- Ministry of Industry, Commerce and Employment (Bhutan)
- Ministry of Infrastructure and Transport (Bhutan)
- Pasakha
- Royal Monetary Authority of Bhutan
- Royal Securities Exchange of Bhutan
- Bhutanese ngultrum, currency
- Economy of South Asia
