= Druk PNB Bank =

Bank in Bhutan

- Company type: Public sector Undertaking
- Founded: 2008
- Headquarters: Thimphu, Bhutan
- Number of locations: 38
- Area served: Bhutan
- Services: Retail banking; Corporate banking; Investment banking; Mortgage loans; Private banking; Wealth management; Credit cards; Finance and Insurance
- Parent: Royal Government of Bhutan and Punjab National Bank
- Website: www.drukpnbbank.bt

Druk PNB Bank is a bank established through collaboration between the Royal Government of Bhutan and Punjab National Bank of India.

== History ==
Druk PNB, incorporated in 2008 under Bhutan's Companies Act, operates as a commercial bank licensed by the Royal Monetary Authority of Bhutan under the 1992 Financial Institutions Act. It is also listed on the Royal Securities Exchange of Bhutan.

As of December 31, 2014, the bank's paid-up capital amounted to Nu 449.712 million, with ownership distributed among Punjab National Bank (51%), Bhutanese promoters (19%), and the general public (30%).

== Controversies ==
In 2023, Thimphu dzongkhag court sentenced the manager responsible for Druk PNB's ATMs, to nine years and six months for embezzling over Nu 10 million from nine ATMs in the capital.

In 2022, The High Court of Bhutan upheld the Thimphu Dzongkhag court's verdict, sentencing a senior executive of Druk PNB, to three years in prison for fraudulently remitting Indian currency from Bhutan. In the ruling on December 15 of last year, the officer was found guilty of aiding Indian vendor in remitting Indian rupees from Druk PNB to individuals in India since 2012.
