= Daw Tenzin =

Bhutanese civil servant

Dasho Daw Tenzin (born 1956) is a Bhutanese civil servant. He was the governor of the central bank, Royal Monetary Authority of Bhutan (RMA), from 18 August 2010 to August 2015.

The Central Bank Act in Bhutan was amended in 2010 so that the Minister of Finance of Bhutan was no longer also the governor of the central bank. Daw Tenzin was RMA's first central bank governor who did not hold the role of finance minister.

Tenzin was employed by RMA in December 2003, as managing director. He has a graduate diploma in development economics from the Australian National University. After his five-year term as governor of the central bank expired in August 2015, Dasho Penjore took over this position.
