= Bank of Bhutan =

Bank in Bhutan

- Type: Public sector Undertaking
- Founded: May 1968; 58 years ago
- Headquarters: Norzin Lam, Thimphu, Bhutan
- Number of locations: 47
- Area served: Worldwide
- Key people: Mr. Thinley Namgyel (Chairman); Mr. Tshering Tenzin (CEO)
- Services: Retail banking; Corporate banking; Investment banking; Mortgage loans; Private banking; Wealth management; Credit cards; Finance and Insurance
- Revenue: ▲US$18,657,123.79 (June 2021)
- Net income: US$2,023,483.97 (June 2021)
- Total equity: ▲US$99,789,161.77 (June 2021) (June 2021)
- Parent: Druk Holding & Investments (DHI) and State Bank of India
- Website: www.bob.bt

Bank of Bhutan (BoB) is the largest and oldest commercial bank in Bhutan. It was established under the provision of the royal charter of May 1968. It was also the only central bank before the Royal Monetary Authority of Bhutan in 1982. It is registered under the Companies Act of Bhutan, 2000 as a public sector commercial bank.

== History ==
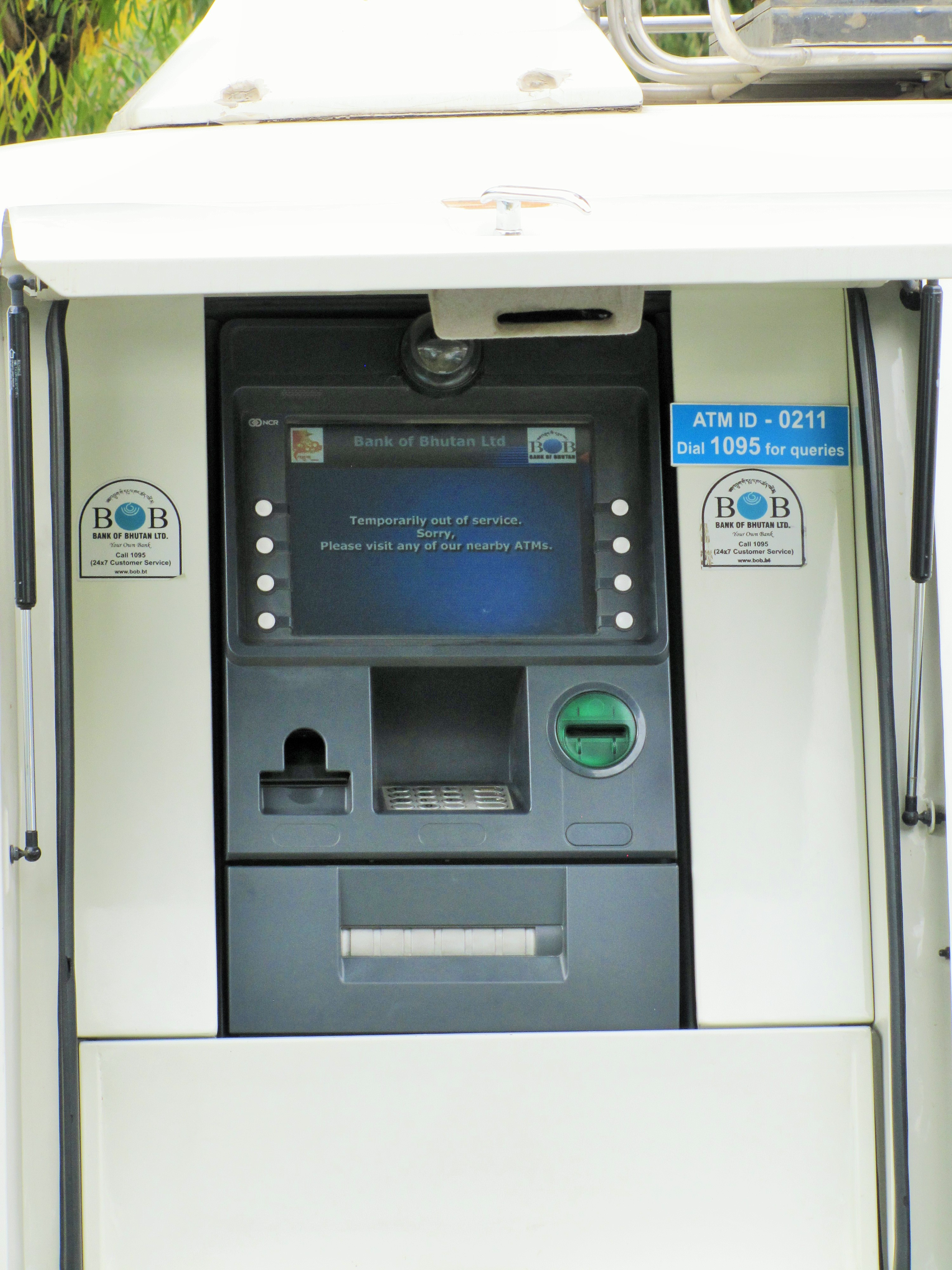
Bank of Bhutan ATM Van in Paro

Founded in 1968, the bank has presence in every Dzongkhang or districts with over 47 branches all over Bhutan. It also introduced ATMs, Point of Sales and Internet Banking services in the country.

As of July 1, 2017, the bank's assets reached 47.7 million Ngultrum (about US$750 thousand). 55% of them consist of loans, primarily consumer loans to the population and mortgages. The bank remains the largest bank in the kingdom. It accounts for 41% of deposits and 32% of loans to the economy.

== Investments ==
The owners of Bank of Bhutan are Druk Holding & Investments Ltd., which owns 80% of the authorized capital, and the State Bank of India, which accounts for 20% of the capital. Until 2007, the Bank was operated by the Ministry of Finance of Bhutan. It is managed by Druk Holding & Investments, which also manages other public sector companies. Druk Holding & Investments is a holding company owned by the Government of Bhutan, whose task is to manage state property. The Ministry of Finance of Bhutan is the sole shareholder of the holding company. Druk Holding & Investments owns 10 state-owned companies in Bhutan, it owns at least 51% of the capital in 4 more subsidiaries, including the Bank, and minority stakes in 5 other companies.

== Foreign exchange ==
Bank of Bhutan is an authorized dealer of foreign exchange in Bhutan. It is authorized to trade the following currencies-

- U.S. dollar
- Pound sterling
- Euro
- Japanese yen
- Swiss franc
- Hong Kong dollar
- Canadian dollar
- Australian dollar
- Danish kroner
- Singapore dollar

== See also ==
- Banking in Bhutan
