= Gomtu =

- Location in Bhutan
- Coordinates: 26°49′05″N 89°11′10″E
- Country: Bhutan
- District: Samtse District

Population (2005)
  - Total: 4,254

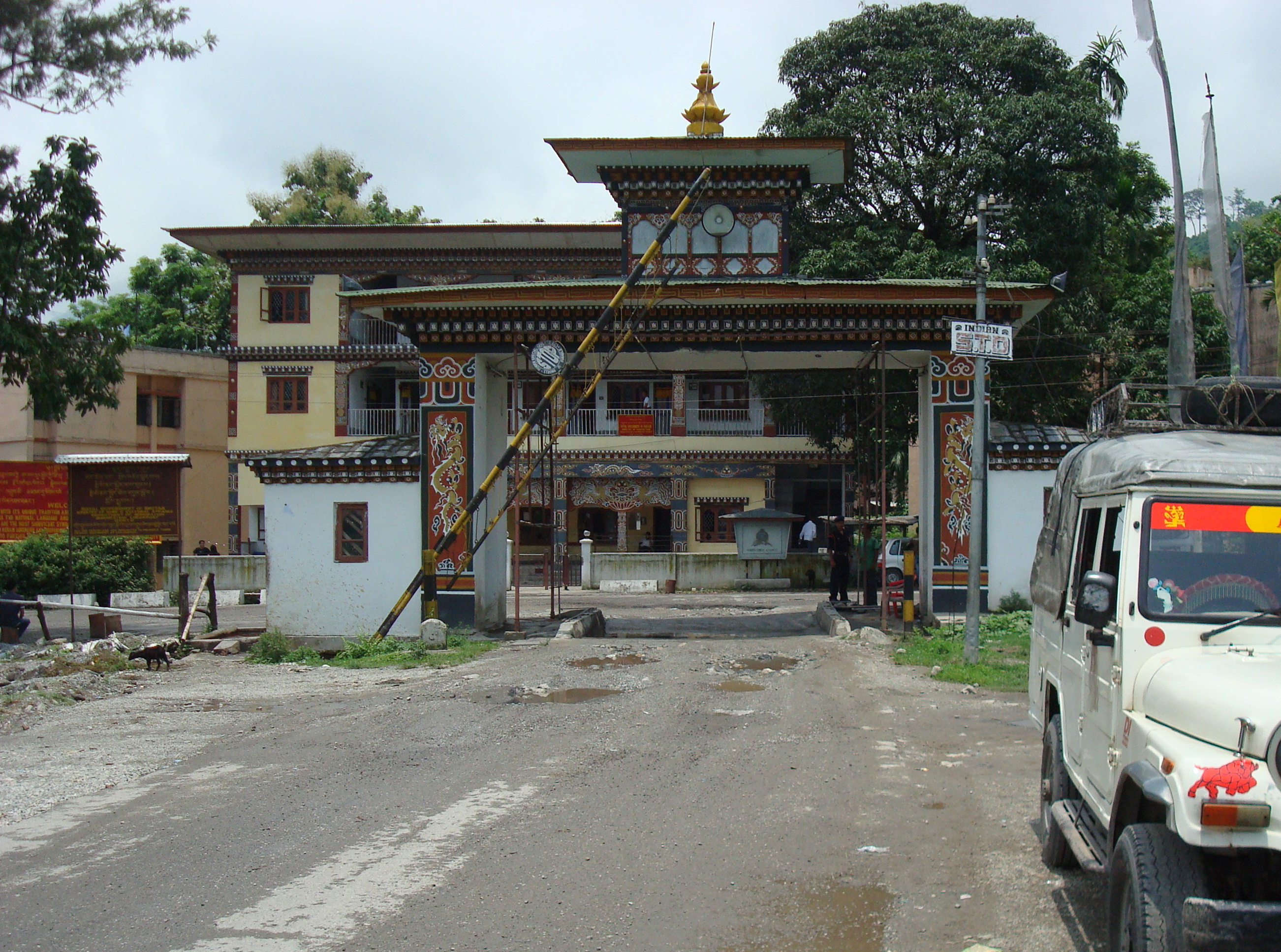
Bhutan border gate with India leading to Gomtu (2009)

Gomtu is a border town in south-western Bhutan near the border with India. It is located in Samtse District. Gomtu is a small industrial town by road only reachable via India. It lays at a distance of some 70 kilometers west of the large Bhutanese border town of Phuentsholing. There are two cement factories based in the Gomtu Industrial Estate, Penden Cement and Lhaki Cement. Gomtu has a government Higher Secondary School and a government referral hospital. In the Pugli Hills around Gomtu the mineral dolomite is mined by the Jigme Mining Corporation Limited.

At the 2005 census, its population was 4,524. The postal code of Gomtu is 22002.
