= .bt =

Top-level Internet domain for Bhutan

- Introduced: 16 July 1997
- TLD type: Country code top-level domain
- Status: Active
- Registry: .bt NIC, operated by DrukNet, a service of Bhutan Telecom
- Sponsor: Ministry of Information and Communication (Bhutan)
- Intended use: Entities connected with Bhutan
- Actual use: Popular in Bhutan
- Registration restrictions: International registration possible, but registrant must provide proof of documents qualifying for registration, like a registered trade license along with an application with the company’s letterhead and seal.
- Structure: Registrations are available at direct third level and direct second-level labels
- Registry website: www.nic.bt

.bt is the Internet country code top-level domain (ccTLD) for the Kingdom of Bhutan. It is administered by the Ministry of Information and Communication.

== Domains and Subdomains ==
Domains and Subdomains with registration qualification requirements:

Domain	Intended purpose
.bt	Organizations or individuals
.com.bt	Commercial organizations or related individuals
.edu.bt	Universities and other educational institutes
.net.bt	Networks
.gov.bt	Government-related websites only
.org.bt	Non-profit organizations
