= Mining in Bhutan =

Mining of industrial minerals was insignificant to Bhutan’s economy except for the production of ferrosilicon. The country’s rugged terrain provides sites to harvest hydropower, which has driven rapid growth in the transport and construction sectors, including the startup of a number of local cement operations.

== Production ==
The country’s mineral industry was small and insignificant to its economy and was dominated by the production of cement, coal, dolomite, gypsum, and limestone. Known resources included deposits of beryl, copper, graphite, lead, mica, pyrite, tin, tungsten, and zinc. A graphite processing plant was established in Paro.

== Structure of the mineral industry ==
The Government, a private-sector company, and a Japanese company formed a joint venture to produce ferrosilicon and other alloys. Cement production also was under the control of the Government.

The Department of Geology and Mines under the Ministry of Economic Affairs has two divisions: the Geological Survey of Bhutan and the Mining Division. The latter is responsible for the inspection and regulation of various mines. In addition, the Ministry’s Department of Energy is in charge of the hydropower development in the energy sector.

== Commodity review ==
Bhutan Ferro Alloys Ltd. produced mainly ferrosilicon, which was exported to India and Japan. The production capacity of its plant at Phuentsholing was 18,000 metric tons per year (t/yr) of ferrosilicon, 4,200 t/yr of micro silica, and 2,400 t/yr of magnesium ferrosilicon. Indigenous quartzite produced by the company’s own captive mines was supplied to the plant. Bhutan Ferro Alloys ordered an 18-megavoltampere smelting furnace to produce other silicon and manganese alloys. The expansion was completed in 2005. The company was a joint venture of the Government, Marubeni Corp. of Japan, and the local Tashi Commercial Corp.

Dolomite quarrying near the Pugli hills at Gomtu in southwestern Bhutan affected agriculture (tea plantations) and wild animals in neighbouring Indian State of West Bengal. Landslides and erosion caused by quarrying left 14 properties prone to flooding. Dolomite sediments turned the tea plantations’ soil alkaline and airborne dust from the quarry choked the plants. Animals were unable to drink river water made red and cloudy by the quarrying.

Bhutan is one of the first nation states to start mining Bitcoin for its governments sovereign wealth fund. It is using renewable hydroelectric power to run the mining operations. This effort is expected to increase projected GDP/GNP dramatically in next few years.
