= List of ecoregions in Bhutan =

Elevation map of Bhutan showing its districts.

The ecoregions of Bhutan generally vary according to altitude and precipitation. Bhutan occupies 38,394 square kilometres (14,824 mi^{2}) in the eastern Himalaya, at altitudes ranging from 97 metres (318 ft) to 7,570 metres (24,840 ft). The dry, plain-like valleys of western and central Bhutan tend to be relatively densely populated and intensely cultivated. The wetter eastern valleys, however, tend to be steeper, narrower ravines. At lower and middle elevations, Indomalayan biomes range from tropical and subtropical forests to temperate coniferous forests. In the northern mountainous regions, Bhutan is largely Palearctic, comprising temperate coniferous forests, montane grasslands and shrublands, and swaths without any ecoregion in its highest glacial elevations.

== List of ecoregions ==
Below is a list of ecoregions in Bhutan.

realm	Biome	Ecoregion	Districts
Indomalayan	Tropical and subtropical moist broadleaf forests	Brahmaputra Valley semi-evergreen forests	Dagana, Pemagatshel, Samdrup Jongkhar, Sarpang, Trashigang
Indomalayan	Temperate broadleaf and mixed forests	Eastern Himalayan broadleaf forests	Chukha, Dagana, Gasa, Haa, Lhuentse, Mongar, Paro, Punakha, Samdrup Jongkhar, Samtse, Sarpang, Thimphu, Trashigang, Trashiyangse, Tsirang, Wangdue Phodrang, Zhemgang
Indomalayan	Temperate coniferous forests	Eastern Himalayan subalpine conifer forests	Bumthang, Chukha, Dagana, Gasa, Haa, Lhuentse, Mongar, Paro, Punakha, Samdrup Jongkhar, Sarpang, Thimphu, Trashigang, Trashiyangse, Trongsa, Tsirang, Wangdue Phodrang, Zhemgang
Indomalayan	Tropical and subtropical moist broadleaf forests	Himalayan subtropical broadleaf forests	Bumthang, Chukha, Dagana, Mongar, Pemagatshel, Samdrup Jongkhar, Samtse, Sarpang, Tsirang, Zhemgang
Indomalayan	Tropical and subtropical coniferous forests	Himalayan subtropical pine forests	Dagana, Trongsa, Tsirang, Wangdue Phodrang, Zhemgang
Indomalayan	Tropical and subtropical grasslands, savannas, and shrublands	Terai-Duar savanna and grasslands	Chukha, Dagana, Samtse
Palearctic	Montane grasslands and shrublands	Eastern Himalayan alpine shrub and meadows	Bumthang, Gasa, Haa, Lhuentse, Paro, Punakha, Thimphu, Trashiyangse, Trongsa, Wangdue Phodrang
Palearctic	Temperate coniferous forests	Northeastern Himalayan subalpine conifer forests	Trashigang

== See also ==
- Geography of Bhutan
- Valleys of Bhutan
- Glaciers of Bhutan
