= Telecommunications in Bhutan =

Telecommunications in Bhutan includes telephones, radio, television, and the Internet.

== Telephones ==
- Main lines: 18,000 lines in use, 174th in the world (2023 est.).
- Mobile cellular: 752,000 lines, 169th in the world (2023 est.).
- Telephone system:
  - general assessment: Urban towns and district headquarters have telecommunications services (2012);
  - domestic: very low tele-density, domestic service is poor especially in rural areas, mobile cellular service available since 2003 is now widely available (2012);
  - international: international telephone and telegraph service via landline and microwave relay through India (2012);
  - satellite earth station: 1 Intelsat (2012).
- Country codes: Bhutan +975, Phuentsholing (0)1, Thimphu (0)2, Bumthang (0)3, Paro (0)8.

== Radio and television ==
- First radio station, Radio NYAB, privately launched in 1973, is now state-owned (2012).
- Five private radio stations are currently broadcasting (2012).
- Radios: 37,000 (1997).
- The Bhutan Broadcasting Service first commenced television transmissions in June 1999, upon legalizing television, one of the last countries in the world to do so.
- Cable TV service offers dozens of Indian and other international channels (2012).
- Televisions: 11,000 (1999).

== Internet ==
- Top level domain: .bt
- Internet hosts: 14,590 hosts, 126th in the world (2012).
- IPv4: 23,552 addresses allocated, 32.9 per 1000 people (2012).
- Internet users: 88% of the population (2023 est.).
- Fixed broadband: 10,000 (2023 est.), 183rd in the world
- Mobile broadband: 17,851 subscriptions, 133rd in the world; 2.5% of population, 122nd in the world (2012).
- Internet service providers: Bhutan's main and only ISP is Druknet, owned by Bhutan Telecom. It provides a dial-up service, at a reasonable cost.
- Internet cafes: Located in most large towns.

== See also ==
- Censorship on the Internet
- Radio Waves, a radio station in located in Thimphu, Bhutan. Formed in December 2010, it is currently run by Kelzang Thinley and broadcasts in Dzongkha and English.
