= International rankings of Bhutan =

These are the international rankings of Bhutan

== International rankings ==
Organization	Survey	Ranking
Institute for Economics and Peace	Global Peace Index	40 out of 144
United Nations Development Programme	Human Development Index	132 out of 182
Transparency International	Corruption Perceptions Index	49 out of 180
World Bank	Ease of Doing Business Index	126 out of 183
Reporters without Borders	Press Freedom Index	70 out of 175
World Intellectual Property Organization	Global Innovation Index, 2026	74 out of 139
