= Raven Crown =

Hat worn by the Kings of Bhutan

The Raven Crown (Dzongkha: དབུ་ཞྭ་བྱ་རོག་ཅན་; Wylie: dbu-zha bja-rog-chen) is worn by the Dragon Kings of Bhutan. It is a hat surmounted by the head of a raven.

== History ==
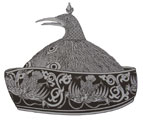
Raven Crown worn by the Dragon Kings of Bhutan.

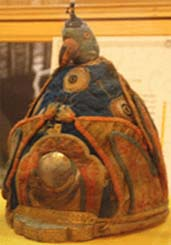
1st prototype of Raven Crown in helmet shape.

Illustrative depiction of the Raven Crown.

The hereditary monarchy of the Wangchuck dynasty in the independent Eastern Himalayan country of Bhutan was established in 1907. The first king of the Wangchuck dynasty, Gongsar Ugyen Wangchuck (1862–1926), was a charismatic figure who came to power against a turbulent background of incessant and complex feuding in that chaotic warrior state.

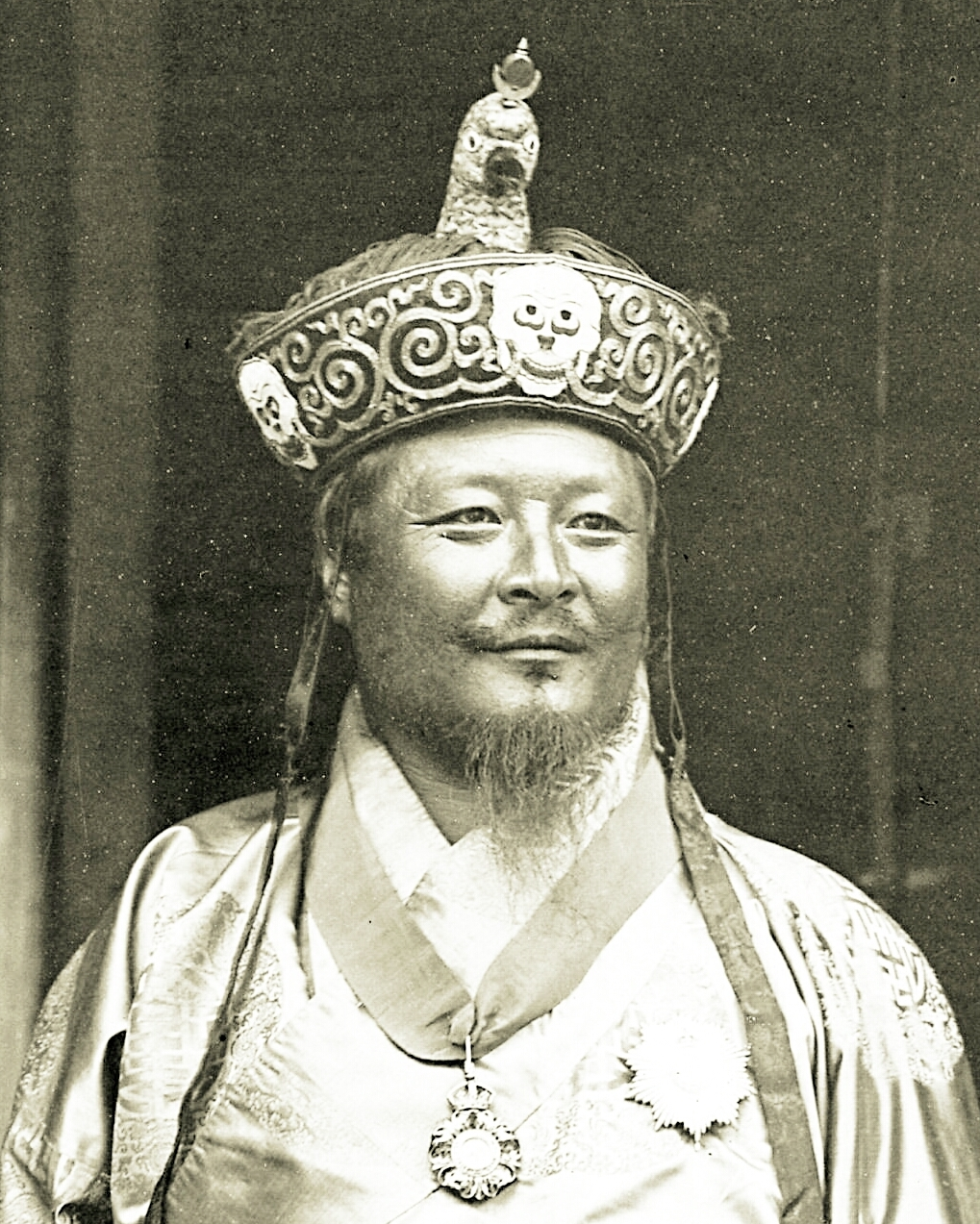
King Ugyen Wangchuck wearing the Raven Crown in Punakha, the old capital of Bhutan, in 1905. Ugyen Wangchuck was the first King of Bhutan, from 1907 to 1926.

He adopted as the unique symbol of his authority a satin and silk crown surmounted by the head of a raven. The bird represents a form of Mahakala, Bhutan's guardian deity. The prototype of the founding monarch's Raven Crown had first been devised as a battle helmet for his father, Jigme Namgyel (1825–1881). Known as the Black Ruler, he had worn it in bloody struggles against his many rivals within the country and against the British who tried, unsuccessfully, to subdue him.

The story of the Wangchuck dynasty's rise and triumph moves from a picture of turmoil and chaos to one of relative peace and stability.

The Raven Crown today is the official crown worn by the Kings of Bhutan. The raven is the national bird of Bhutan. The raven is known locally as Jaroq.
