= Bhutan Telecom =

Bhutan Telecom Limited
- Native name: འབྲུག་བརྒྱུད་འཕྲིན་ཚད།
- Company type: State-owned
- Industry: Telecommunications; Mobile network operator; Internet service provider
- Founded: 1 July 2000; 25 years ago
- Headquarters: 2/28 Drophen Lam, Thimphu, Bhutan
- Area served: Bhutan
- Key people: Karma Jurme (CEO)
- Products: Fixed-line telephony; Mobile telephony; Broadband; Web hosting; Cloud services; GSM; GPRS; EDGE; UMTS; HSDPA; LTE; 5G NR
- Website: www.bt.bt

Bhutan Telecom (Dzongkha: འབྲུག་བརྒྱུད་འཕྲིན།) is a telecommunications and Internet service provider in the Kingdom of Bhutan. It is the sole fixed-line telephony provider in the country. It also operates the B-Mobile mobile service and the DrukNet Internet service.

== History ==
Bhutan Telecom was established on 1 July 2000.

== B-Mobile ==
B-Mobile provides service in all 205 Gewogs (Blocks) in Bhutan. It operates on 900/1800 MHz GSM/GPRS/EDGE, 850 MHz UMTS/HSDPA and 1800 MHz LTE frequencies.

LTE 4G was first launched in Thimphu on 24 October 2013. 4G service operates in 1800 MHz - band 3 (FDD). 5G NR was launched in Thimphu on 27 December 2021.

== See also ==
- Telecommunications in Bhutan
