= Bhutanese ngultrum =

Currency of Bhutan

Ngultrum
དངུལ་ཀྲམ (Dzongkha)

ISO 4217
- Code: BTN (numeric: 064)
- Subunit: 0.01

Unit
- Symbol: Nu.

Denominations
- Subunit
- 1/100: chetrum
- Symbol
- chetrum: Ch.
- Banknotes: Nu.1, Nu.5, Nu.10, Nu.20, Nu.50, Nu.100, Nu.500, Nu.1000
- Coins
- Rarely used: Ch.5, Ch.10, Ch.25, Ch.50, Nu.1, Nu.3

Demographics
- Date of introduction: 1974
- User(s): Bhutan (alongside Indian rupee)

Issuance
- Monetary authority: Royal Monetary Authority of Bhutan
- Website: www.rma.org.bt

Valuation
- Inflation: 5.2%
- Source: Royal Monetary Authority of Bhutan, 2015 est.
- Pegged with: (India) Indian rupee (at par)

The ngultrum (/əŋˈɡʊltrəm/ əng-GUUL-trəm or /əŋˈɡuː(l)trəm/ əng-GOO(L)-trəm; Dzongkha: དངུལ་ཀྲམ, romanized: dngul kram, IPA: [ŋýˈʈúm], lit. 'silver coin'; symbol: Nu., code: BTN) is the currency of the Kingdom of Bhutan. It is subdivided into 100 chhertum (Dzongkha: ཕྱེད་ཏམ, romanized: phyed tam, IPA: [pt͡ɕʰɛ́ˈtám], lit. 'half [coin]'; spelled as chetrums on coins until 1979). The Royal Monetary Authority of Bhutan, the central bank of Bhutan, is the minting authority of the ngultrum banknotes and coins. The ngultrum is currently pegged to the Indian rupee at parity.

== History ==
Until 1789, the coins of the Cooch Behar mint circulated in Bhutan. Following this, Bhutan began issuing its own coins known as chetrum, mostly silver 1/2 rupees. Hammered silver and copper coins were the only types issued until 1929, when modern style silver 1/2 rupee coins were introduced, followed by bronze 1 paisa in 1931 (dated 1928). Nickel 1/2 rupee coins were introduced in 1950. While the Cooch Behar mint coins circulated alongside Bhutan's own coins, decimalization was introduced in 1957, when Bhutan's first issue of coins denominated in naya paisa. The 1966 issues were 25 naya paisa, 50 naya paisa and 1 rupee coins, struck in cupro-nickel.

While the Bhutanese government developed its economy in the early 1960s, monetization in 1968 led to the establishment of the Bank of Bhutan. As monetary reforms took place in 1974, the Ngultrum was officially introduced as 100 Chhetrum equal to 1 Ngultrum. The Ngultrum retained the peg to the Indian rupee at par, which the Bhutanese coins had maintained.

The term derives from the Dzongkha ngul, "silver" and trum, a Hindi loanword meaning "money."

The Ministry of Finance issued its first banknotes in 1974 in denominations of Nu.1, Nu.5, Nu.10 and Nu.100. This was followed by the establishment of the Royal Monetary Authority of Bhutan as the central bank of Bhutan in 1982, which took over the authority to issue banknotes in 1983, replacing the authority of the Ministry of Finance.

== Coins ==
In 1974, aluminum Ch.5 and Ch.10, aluminium-bronze Ch.20, and cupro-nickel Ch.25 and Nu.1 were introduced. The Ch.5 was square and the Ch.10 was scallop-shaped. A new coinage was introduced in 1979, consisting of bronze Ch.5 and Ch.10, and cupro-nickel Ch.25 and Ch.50 and Nu.1 and Nu.3. Aluminium-bronze Ch.25 was also issued dated 1979. Ch.5 and Ch.10 have largely ceased circulating. Currently, coins are available in denominations of Ch.20, Ch.25, Ch.50 and Nu.1.

Image	Value	Technical parameters				Description		Date of	
Image	Value	Diameter	Thickness	Weight	Edge	Obverse	Reverse	issue	withdrawal
	Ch.20	22.00 mm	1.8 mm	4.5 g	Reeded	Man working in field. Lettering: ཀུན་ལ་བཟའ་བཏུང FOOD FOR ALL	Lesser Version of Coat of Arms; Lettering: འབྲུག BHUTAN CHETRUMS 20 ཕྱེད་ཊམ	1974	Current
	Ch.25	22.20 mm	1.8 mm	4.6 g	Reeded	Golden fishes of good fortune. Lettering: ROYAL GOVERNMENT OF BHUTAN	Dorje (a double diamond-thunderbolt) is a part of Coat of Arms and represents the harmony between secular and religious power Lettering: ཕྱེད་ཀྲམ་ཉེར་ལྔ། TWENTY-FIVE CHHERTUM	1979	Current
	Ch.50	25.85 mm	1.8 mm	6.9 g	Reeded	Treasure vase (One of the 8 Revered Buddhist Symbols). Lettering: ROYAL GOVERNMENT OF BHUTAN	Eight Various Revered Buddhist Symbols & in the center is the word འབྲུག (BHUTAN); Lettering: ཕྱེད་ཀྲམ་ལྔ་བཅུ། FIFTY CHHERTUM.	1979	Current
	Nu.1	27.95 mm	1.7 mm	8.2 g	Reeded	Coat of Arms within circle, date below Elaborate designed Wheel of Dharma on a Lotus. Lettering: ROYAL GOVERNMENT OF BHUTAN	Coin divided into nine sections within circle, each has symbol, denomination below Eight Various Revered Buddhist Symbols & in the center is the word འབྲུག; Lettering: དངུལ་ཀྲམ་གཅིག། ONE NGULTRUM	1979	Current

== Banknotes ==
=== Previous series ===
On June 2, 1974, Nu.1, Nu.5 and Nu.10 notes were introduced by the Royal Government of Bhutan, followed by Nu.2, Nu.20, Nu.50, and Nu.100 in 1978. On August 4, 1982, the Royal Monetary Authority of Bhutan Act was enacted, although the RMA did not begin operations until November 1, 1983, and did not issue its own family of notes until 1986.

Previous series
Image		Value	Dimensions	Main Colour	Description		
Obverse	Reverse	Value	Dimensions	Main Colour	Obverse	Reverse	Watermark
		Nu.1	114 x 62 mm	Blue	The Government crest, two dragons	Simtokha Dzong	"Royal Monetary Authority" in top and bottom margin
		Nu.5	130 × 62 mm	Orange	The Government crest, two mythical bird (Bja Tshering) (the bird of long life)	Paro Rinpung Dzong	"Royal Monetary Authority" in top and bottom margin
		Nu.10	140 × 70 mm	Purple	The Government crest, Dungkar (conch) (one of the eight lucky signs), Jigme Singye Wangchuck	Paro Rinpung Dzong	"Royal Monetary Authority" in top and bottom margin
		Nu.20	152 × 70 mm	Yellow-green	The Government crest, Khorlo (Wheel of Dharma, one of the eight auspicious signs), Jigme Dorji Wangchuck	Punakha Dzong	"Royal Monetary Authority" in top and bottom margin
		Nu.50	155 × 70 mm	Pink	The Government crest, Khorlo (Wheel of Dharma, one of the eight auspicious signs), Jigme Dorji Wangchuck	Trongsa Dzong, two mythical birds Bja Tshering (bird of long life)	"Royal Monetary Authority" in top and bottom margin
		Nu.100	161 × 70 mm	Green	Norbu Rimpochhe (one of the seven auspicious gems), Jigme Singye Wangchuck	Tashichho Dzong	Crossed Dorji (Dorji jardrum)
		Nu.500	160 × 70 mm	Red	Norbu Rimpochhe encircled by two Dragons (one of the seven auspicious gems), Ugyen Wangchuck	Punakha Dzong	Crossed Dorji (Dorji jardrum)
For table standards, see the banknote specification table.

=== Present series ===
In 2006, the Monetary Authority introduced its latest series of notes, with denominations of Nu.1, Nu.5, Nu.10, Nu.20, Nu.50, Nu.100, Nu.500, and Nu.1000. These notes use a hybrid substrate.

2006–present Series
Image		Value	Dimensions	Main Color	Description		Date of issue	Date of first issue	Watermark
Obverse	Reverse	Value	Dimensions	Main Color	Obverse	Reverse	Date of issue	Date of first issue	Watermark
		Nu.1	120 x 60 mm	Blue, red and green	Dragons flanking Wheel of Dharma	Simtokha Dzong	2006; 2013	November 20, 2006	None
		Nu.5	125 x 60 mm	Yellow, brown and red	Birds	Paro Taktsang	2006; 2011; 2015	November 20, 2006	None
		Nu.10	125 x 65 mm	Purple, dark green and yellow	Jigme Singye Wangchuck; Dungkar (conch), one of the eight good luck symbols	Paro Rinpung Dzong	2006; 2013	2007	Jigme Singye Wangchuck
		Nu.20	130 x 65 mm	Yellow and green	Jigme Dorji Wangchuck	Punakha Dzong	2006; 2013	November 20, 2006	Jigme Dorji Wangchuck
		Nu.50	145 x 70 mm	Pink, orange and green	Jigme Khesar Namgyel Wangchuck	Trongsa Dzong	2008; 2013	November 6, 2008	Jigme Khesar Namgyel Wangchuck
		Nu.100	145 x 70 mm	Green	Jigme Singye Wangchuck; Norbu Rimpochhe, one of the seven auspicious gems	Tashichho Dzong, dragons in upper corners	2006; 2011; 2015	2007	Jigme Singye Wangchuck
		Nu.500	155 x 70 mm	Pink, orange and green	Ugyen Wangchuck with the Raven Crown	Punakha Dzong	2006; 2011	November 20, 2006	Jigme Singye Wangchuck
		Nu.1000	165 x 70 mm	Yellow, red and gold	Jigme Khesar Namgyel Wangchuck with the Raven Crown	Tashichho Dzong	2008; 2016	November 6, 2008	Jigme Khesar Namgyel Wangchuck
For table standards, see the banknote specification table.

=== Commemorative notes ===
Commemorative notes
Image	Value	Dimensions	Main Color	Description		Date of issue	Date of first issue	Watermark
Image	Value	Dimensions	Main Color	Obverse	Reverse	Date of issue	Date of first issue	Watermark
	Nu.100	145 x 70 mm	Green, orange, brown and red	Mythical angel carrying the Raven Crown; national emblem; royal wedding logo consisting of khorlo (wheel) signifying royalty, circles with dhar (ceremonial scarf) signifying eternal union of thap (method) and sherab (wisdom), and the dham tshig tsangma and lotus, symbolizing purity of union; Jigme Khesar Namgyel Wangchuck and Queen Jetsun Pema	Punakha Dzong (aka Pungtang Dechen Photrang Dzong, meaning “the palace of great happiness or bliss”)	2011	October 13, 2011	None
	Nu.100	146 x 70 mm	Yellow, gold, blue, and red	King Jigme Khesar Namgyel Wangchuck and Queen Jetsun Pema; Jigme Namgyel Wangchuck	Mountains; dragon	February 5, 2016	2017	Jigme Singye Wangchuck with electrotype swirl
For table standards, see the banknote specification table.

== Exchange rate ==
Current BTN exchange rates
From Google Finance:	AUD CAD CHF CNY EUR GBP HKD JPY USD
From Yahoo! Finance:	AUD CAD CHF CNY EUR GBP HKD JPY USD
From XE.com:	AUD CAD CHF CNY EUR GBP HKD JPY USD
From OANDA:	AUD CAD CHF CNY EUR GBP HKD JPY USD
