= Bhutan National Bank =

Commercial bank in Bhutan

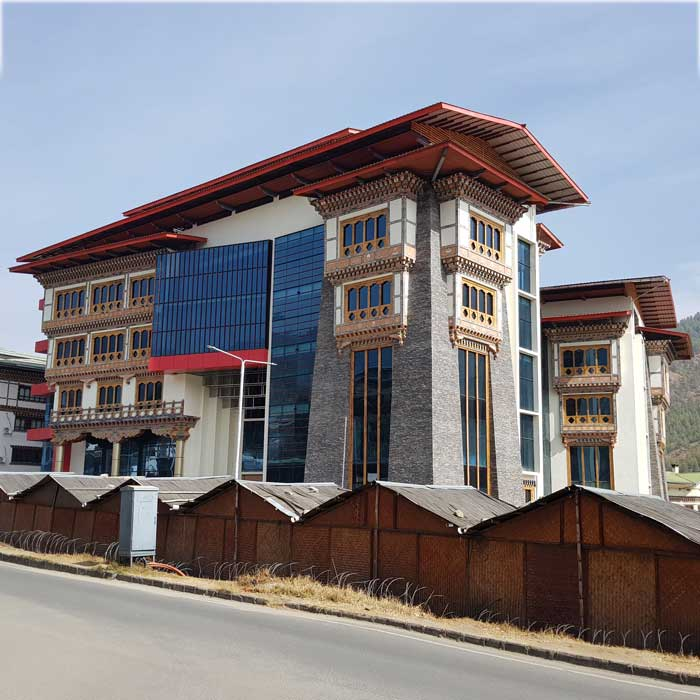
- Bhutan National Bank in Thimphu
- Industry: Financial services
- Founded: 1997; 29 years ago
- Headquarters: PO Box 439, Thimphu, Bhutan
- Key people: Dorji Namgyal Rinchhen - Chief Executive Officer (Since September 2026)
- Number of employees: 500+
- Website: www.bnb.bt

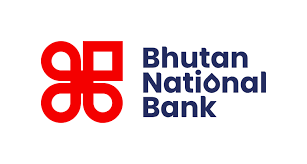

Bhutan National Bank is a commercial bank founded in 1997 and located in Thimphu, capital of the Kingdom of Bhutan.

Bhutan National Bank Limited started operations as Unit Trust of Bhutan (UTB) on 25 July 1980, with an initial funding of Nu. 2.5 million by Royal Insurance Corporation of Bhutan . The trust functioned as a subsidiary of RICB, with its purpose set to inculcate saving habits among the general public and to channel resources into productive sectors. On 1st January 1992, the Royal Government conferred the Trust with the status of an independent financial institution. In its first year, the Trust declared a profit of mere Nu. 9,618.86.

UTB was subsequently converted into a commercial bank with technical assistance from Asian Development Bank in 1995.

The first IPO of BNB was offered to the public in 1996, which made the bank the only financial institution with public ownership, with a significant portion of its ownership with the public (28.58%) . In 1997, Government divested its equity of 40% to ADB and Citibank. These two organizations have since divested their shares to the employees of the bank and the bhutanese public; currently International Finance Corporation (IFC) is the only foreign entity with shares in BNB- it owns about 11% of the bank's shares. At the time of the start of operations of the bank in January 1997, the paid up capital of the bank was Nu. 59.5 million and a net worth of Nu. 139 million.

BNB was the pioneer when it came into being in 1996, having started with a computerized banking environment; the initial software adopted by the bank was called Micro Banker. At the time the only other bank, Bank of Bhutan was providing banking services manually. Micro Banker was upgraded to iFlex Solutions' (now owned by Oracle) Flexcube in January 2003. BNB was also the first bank in the country to launch the ATM services in 2004.

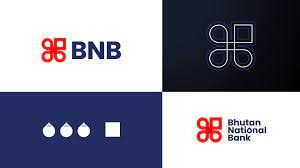
BNB's New logo

Following the launch of ATM services, the bank also introduced Point of Sale (POS) terminals in 2007 and in 2008, upgraded its banking software from Flexcube 4.5 to Flexcube Corporate 7.3. In order to provide better and faster services to clients, SMS and Internet Banking were launched in 2009. On 12th April 2011, BNB launched Recurring Deposit and Rupee Denominated Prepaid card in partnership with Axis Bank, India. (since discontinued). The bank joined the Bhutan Financial Switch (BFS), which was inaugurated by the Prime Minister of Bhutan in 2011.

In 2013, the bank upgraded its IT systems to Oracle 12; it was further upgraded to Oracle 14.x in 2024.

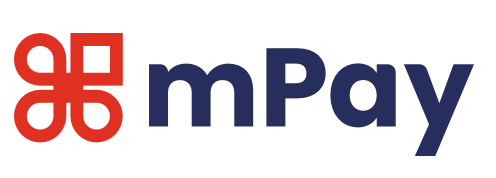
MPay- BNB's Mobile Banking App

The bank launched its mobile banking app in 2016, and later upgraded it in 2018, making it faster, better, and adding more services.

In 2019, BNB became to the first bank to issue RuPay debit cards in Bhutan; in the same year it became a primary member of the VISA card network. BNB currently issues RuPay debit cards, and VISA debit and credit cards.

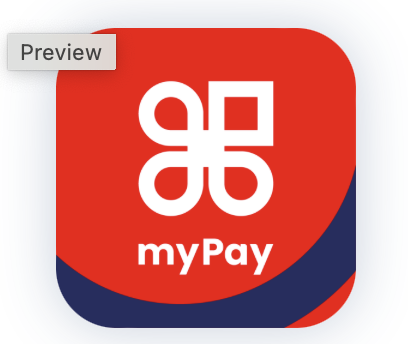
BNB Wallet MyPay

Currently, BNBL is the second largest bank in Bhutan by asset size, and provides all kinds of banking services, including Trade Finance, CASA accounts, Loans, Remittances, Mobile and Internet Banking, POS-based Agency Banking via its "Ngotshab" service, Cards, and wallet service, MyPay. It also has tie-ups with international money transfer services MoneyGram and Ria, to facilitate remittances. The bank also launched its own remittance platform BNB Remit in 2023.

In 2024 the bank rebranded itself, aligning with its upgraded core banking system.

== Management Team ==
Bhutan National Bank is currently headed by Mr Dorji Namgyal Rinchen, Chief Executive Officer, who has been the CEO of the Bank since September 2026. He is assisted by a team of two Directors: Mr. Hem Kumar Acharya, who heads Banking Operations and Mr. Dorji, who looks after the Corporate Services Department.

At the helm of the Bank is the bank's Board of Directors, currently chaired by Dasho Karma Tshiteem, nominee of the National Pension and Provident Fund, which holds about 25% of the bank's shares.

Prior to Sonam Tobgay, Mr. Kipchu Tshering was the CEO of the bank for 22 years, having been appointed to the position in June 1997, when the bank was just 6-months old. He is credited with stirring up the competitive landscape in banking in Bhutan, and bringing in revolutionary changes of the time.

== History ==
The main events include:

- 1980 – the Unit Trust of Bhutan was founded by the Royal Government and the Royal Insurance Corporation of Bhutan (RICB)
- 1992 – the Trust received the status of independent financial institution
- 1995 – with the assistance of the Asian Development Bank the Trust was converted to a commercial bank Bhutan National Bank
- 1996 – the bank's equity was offered to the public
- 1997 – the bank was officially opened, 40 percent of its equity was sold to the Asian Development Bank and Citibank
- 2004 – launched the first ATM services in Bhutan
- 2007 – introduced the debit Point of Sale terminals in Bhutan
- 2009 – started the SMS banking and Internet banking
- 2011 – introduced the recurring deposit and Rupee Denominated Prepaid card.
- 2016 – Introduced MPay mobile Banking App
- 2019- First Bank in Bhutan to issue RuPay cards; Became Primary Member of VISA. Got ISO and PCI DSS certified; moved its Corporate Office to its newly constructed building.
- 2023- MyPay Introduced
- 2024- Rebranded itself with new colors

== See also ==
- List of banks in Asia
