= Royal Insurance Corporation of Bhutan =

The Royal Insurance Corporation of Bhutan (RICB) is an insurance corporation based in Thimphu, Bhutan.
