= Royal Monetary Authority of Bhutan =

Central bank of Bhutan

Coordinates: 27°21′30″N 88°43′52″E

Royal Monetary Authority of Bhutan རྒྱལ་གཞུང་དངུལ་ལས་དབང་འཛིན་

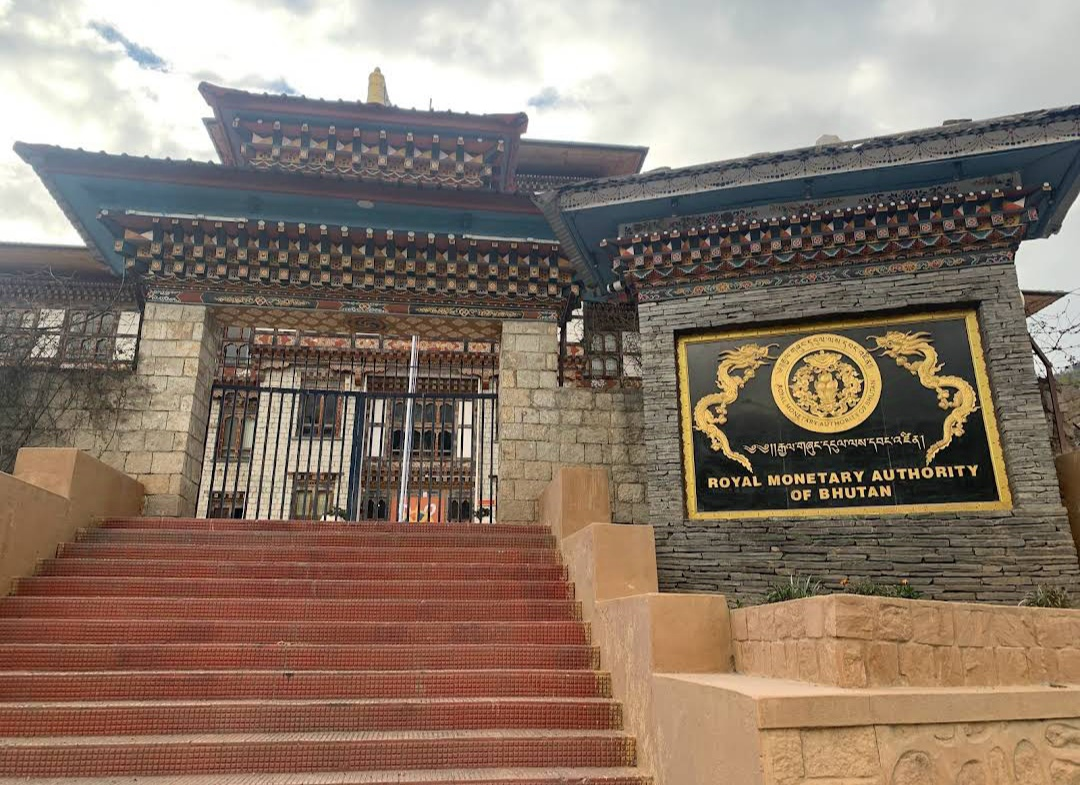
- Central bank of: Bhutan
- Headquarters: Thimphu, Bhutan
- Established: 4 August 1982 (legal); 1 April 1983 (began operations)
- Ownership: 100% state ownership
- Governor: Yangchen Tshogyel
- Currency: Ngultrum; BTN (ISO 4217)
- Reserves: 1 090 million USD
- Website: www.rma.org.bt

The Royal Monetary Authority of Bhutan (Dzongkha: རྒྱལ་གཞུང་དངུལ་ལས་དབང་འཛིན་) is the central bank of Bhutan and is a member of the Asian Clearing Union. It is also the minting authority for the Bhutanese Ngultrum. The Royal Monetary Authority of Bhutan was established under the Royal Monetary Authority of Bhutan Act of 1982. Subsequently, the Act of 1982 was amended by the Financial Institutions Act of 1992 and replaced in its entirety by the Royal Monetary Authority Act of 2010.

== History ==
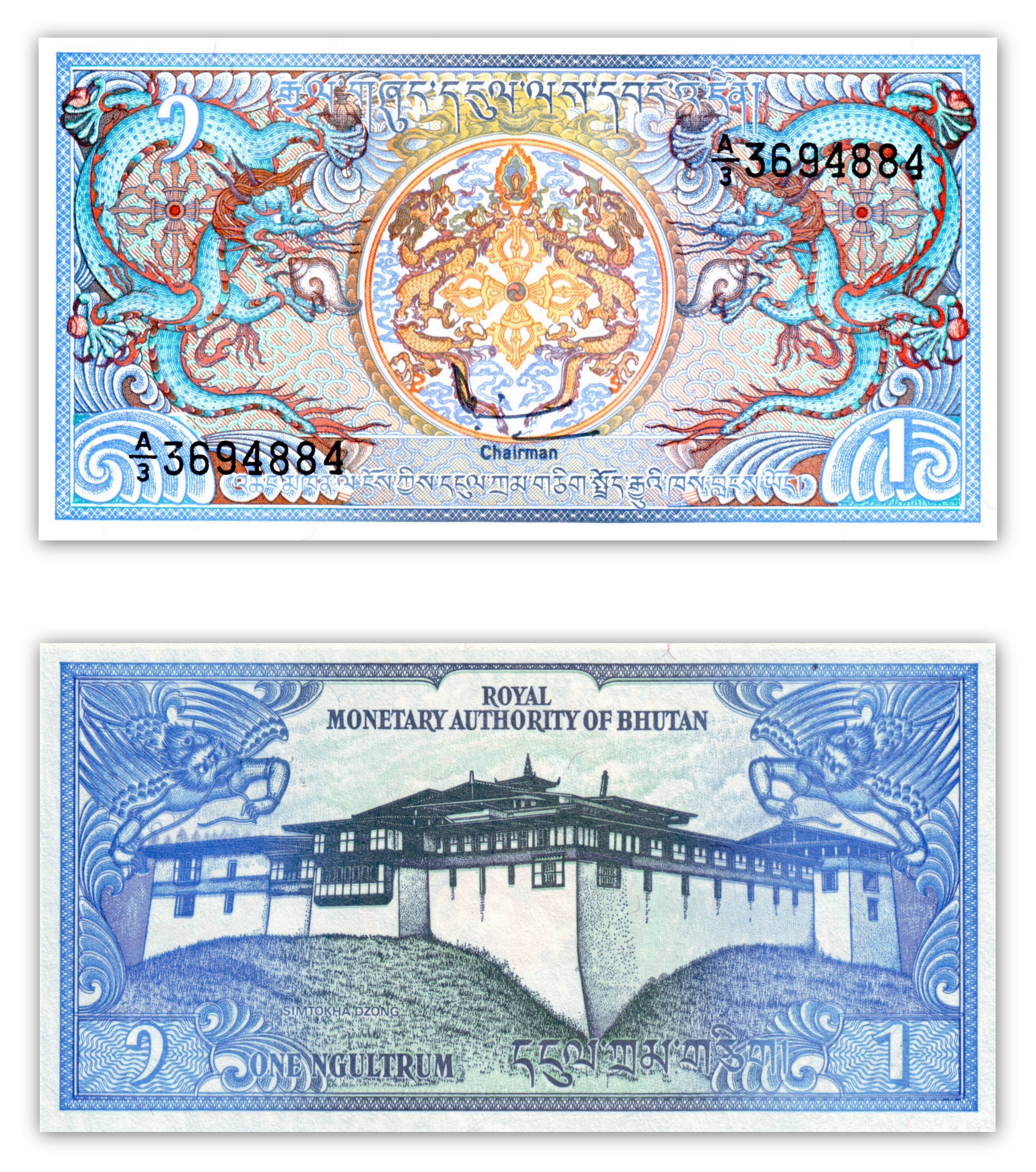
Bhutanese Ngultrum

The Royal Monetary Authority was established in 1982. The following year, it took on the responsibilities of issuing Bhutanese currency, managing external reserves, and operating foreign exchanges. In 1988, the Authority assumed the role of government banker, holding the bulk of government deposits and providing financing. With the passage of the Financial Institutions Act of 1992, the substantive framework of the Authority was expanded to include licensure, regulation, and inspection of financial institutions in Bhutan. The Constitution of 2008 specifically authorizes the government to manage public finance and the monetary system, affirming previous law. Public finance is backed by the Consolidated Fund, while the monetary system is the purview of the Central Bank. (Note: Constitution: Art. 14, §§ 2, 3, 5)

Prior to the establishment of the RMA in 1982, functions relating to central banking were conducted principally by three agencies viz., the Ministry of Finance, State Trading Corporation of Bhutan and Bank of Bhutan.

The Ministry of Finance was the currency issuer of Ngultrum (the Bhutanese currency) and had printed and issued the first Ngultrum notes in denomination of Nu 1, Nu 5, Nu 10 and Nu 100 in 1974 coinciding with the coronation of the Fourth Druk Gyalpo, His Majesty Jigme Singye Wangchuck. The Ministry also functioned as the custodian of foreign exchange balances received, essentially, as aid, which were kept with correspondent banks abroad in the name of the Ministry.

The State Trading Corporation of Bhutan (which handled exports to countries other than India and ensured the repatriation of foreign exchange receipts) also held foreign exchange in its own name. The Bank of Bhutan which handled all commercial banking business in Bhutan also extended credit to the Government; financed other Government organizations against Government guarantees, and was the conduit through which Ngultrum notes and coins were issued to the public.

Implementation of Five Years Plans resulted in robust growth, and accordingly complexity and dynamism of the economy increased. With these rapid developments, the Government, toward the end of the fourth plan, felt the need for an organization, capable of centralizing dispersed central banking functions. With the objective of setting up an institution capable of performing a minimum of central banking functions and one that could generate information adequate for monetary management, the Government requested the IMF for technical assistance in July 1981. Subsequently, Mr. Rechards H. Miller, Advisor, Central Banking Department IMF was appointed to study feasibility and recommend legal frame to set up a Monetary Authority.

The Millar Report on the rationale and legal framework for the Monetary Authority was presented to the National Assembly during its 56th Session and on 4 August 1982 the Royal Monetary Authority of Bhutan Act, 1982 was enacted. Immediately after the enactment Her Royal Highness HRH Ashi Sonam Chhoden Wangchuck, Representative of His Majesty in the Ministry of Finance was appointed as its first chairman while the current Minister of Work and Housing Lyonpo Yeshey Zimba became the founder managing director of the RMA. However, due to lack of appropriate and adequate manpower, it took about a year for the RMA to finally emerge as an organization. During the initial stages of RMA's development, various central banking functions continued to remain with the Ministry of Finance. As organizational capacities developed, particularly after the appointment of Mr Rabenath Mitra, a retired executive director of RBI in August 1983 as General Advisor under the IMF Technical Assistance, these responsibilities were gradually shifted to the RMA in a phase manner.

On November 1, 1983, the RMA started its actual operation by taking over the liability of notes and coins previously issued by the Ministry of Finance. The RMA also took over from the Government its unissued stock of notes and coins. Thereafter, the Authority took on the responsibility of consolidating, managing and operating foreign exchange reserve. In 1985, the IMF appointed Mr. Klaus Dornseif, Bundes Bank Germany, as an advisor in setting up Research and Statics Department and was instrumental in bringing out the first Annual Report in the same year besides other publications such as Quarterly Economic Indicator in 1986.

In 1988, the Authority assumed the role of government banker, holding bulk of government deposits and providing finance through ways and means advance to the Government. The Agreement governing the grant of ways and means advance to the Government by the RMA was executed on 29 February 1988. With the passage of the Financial Institution Act of Bhutan1992, the Royal Monetary Authority Act 1982 was amended to include licensure, regulation and supervision of financial institutions of Bhutan.

After Bhutan made the momentous transition to a Democratic Constitutional Monarchy in 2008, the Royal Monetary Authority of Bhutan, Act, 1982 was revised in entirety to meet the current needs. Accordingly, the Royal Monetary Authority Act of Bhutan 2010 was enacted by the Parliament of the Kingdom of Bhutan in June 2010 at its 5th Session of the First Parliament replacing the Royal Monetary Authority of Bhutan Act, 1982. With the historic enactment of the Royal Monetary Authority Act of Bhutan 2010, and the appointment of Bhutan's first Central Bank Governor, Dasho Daw Tenzin by the 5th Druk Gyalpo on August 18, 2010, the status of the RMA has been elevated to that of an autonomous Central Bank with greater powers in terms of its mode of functioning and decision-making process. It now performs all central bank's functions that are generally performed by the central banks in other countries.

== Authority administration ==
The Royal Monetary Authority Act of 2010, the latest legislation on the Royal Monetary Authority, streamlined the codification of its functions. The Act of 2010 refines the framework of the board of directors and executive committee, which comprise the administration of the Authority. (Note: Royal Monetary Authority Act (RMAA) (2010): §§ 28–59) It also establishes an Audit Committee for internal auditing confirmed by external audits by the Royal Audit Authority, and for publication of statistics. (Note: RMAA (2010): §§ 64, 65, 156–168)

The board of directors is a rulemaking authority consisting of seven people: a royally appointed Governor, as chair; two Deputy Governors, one of whom serves as Secretary; and four others appointed by the government including one member of the Ministry of Finance. (Note: RMAA (2010): §§ 33–37, 184) The appointed members hold office for five years, may be reappointed once, and are forbidden to hold political affiliations or substantial interests – including any shares – in financial institutions. (Note: RMAA (2010): §§ 37–39) The Deputy Governors are appointed by the Board itself. (Note: RMAA (2010): §§ 44–47) The Board, in addition to its rulemaking authority, is also authorized to establish divisions and delegate functions as it sees fit. (Note: RMAA (2010): §§ 31, 32)

The executive committee also has seven members: the Governor; the two Deputy Governors; and four others appointed from among the heads of Authority Divisions by the Governor in consultation with the Deputy Governors. (Note: RMAA (2010): §§ 56–59) The Governor, as the executive, is responsible to the Board for the implementation of the policy and the management of the Authority. (Note: RMAA (2010): §§ 60–63) The Act of 2010 further promulgates a code of professional and personal conduct, integrity and secrecy requirements, duties under conflict of interest, and a law of accountability for those employed in the Authority. (Note: RMAA (2010): §§ 74–85)

The Act of 2010 also codifies the role of the Authority in currency, exchanges, official practices, and defines related penal offenses. (Note: RMAA (2010): §§ 87–107) The Act of 2010 streamlines regulations on external reserves and foreign exchange. (Note: RMAA (2010): §§ 108–118) It restates the relationship between the Authority and financial institutions and formally enables the Authority to act as the fiscal agent, adviser, and bank to the government of Bhutan. (Note: RMAA (2010): §§ 119–147) Under the law, government credit and solvency are substantively and procedurally regulated, restricting government loans and advising the government on its budget to prevent indebtedness. (Note: RMAA (2010): §§ 148–154)

=== Chairpersons 1983–2010 ===
- Ashi Sonam Choden Wangchuck, 1983–1990
- Lyonpo Dorji Tshering, 1991–1998
- Lyonpo Yeshey Zimba, 1998–2002
- Lyonpo Wangdi Norbu, 2003–2007
- Lyonpo Kinzang Dorji, 2007–2008
- Lyonpo Wangdi Norbu, 2008–2010

=== Managing directors 1983–2010 ===
- Lyonpo Yeshey Zimba, 1983–1986
- Dasho Bap Kesang, 1987–1991
- Dasho Sonam Wangchuk, 1992–2003
- Dasho Daw Tenzin, 2003–2010

=== Governors since 2010 ===
- Dasho Daw Tenzin, 2010 to 2015, first governor
- Dasho Penjore, 2015–2025
- Dasho Yangchen Tshogyel, 2026-

== Other key people ==
Deputy Governor	Ms. Ugyen Choden
Director, Department of Internal Audit	Mr. Kelang Jurmey
Executive Director, Department of Foreign Exchange & Reserve Management	Ms. Gopi Nepal
Executive Director, Department of Treasury & Corporate Services	Ms. Tshering Dema
Director, Financial Intelligence Department	Mr. Tashi Gyeltshen
Director, Department of Technology and Innovation	Mr. Sherab Jamtsho
Director, Macroeconomic Research & Statistics Department	Mr. Sonam Tobgay
Officiating Director, Department of Financial Regulation & Supervision	Mr. Shankar Chhetri
Officiating Director, Department of Payment & Settlement Systems	Mr. Sonam Tobgay Tshering
Executive Director, Department of Currency Management	Mr. Dophu Dorji
Officiating Director, Regional Office, Phuntsholing	Mr. Sangay Paljor

== Financial Inclusion ==
The Royal Monetary Authority of Bhutan is also active in promoting financial inclusion policy and a member of the Alliance for Financial Inclusion.

== See also ==
- Bhutanese Ngultrum
- Economy of Bhutan
- Bhutanese legislation
- List of central banks
- List of financial supervisory authorities by country
